

66001–66100 

|-bgcolor=#E9E9E9
| 66001 ||  || — || July 17, 1998 || Woomera || F. B. Zoltowski || EUN || align=right | 3.8 km || 
|-id=002 bgcolor=#fefefe
| 66002 ||  || — || July 29, 1998 || Caussols || ODAS || — || align=right | 1.8 km || 
|-id=003 bgcolor=#d6d6d6
| 66003 ||  || — || July 20, 1998 || Xinglong || SCAP || SAN || align=right | 7.6 km || 
|-id=004 bgcolor=#d6d6d6
| 66004 ||  || — || July 26, 1998 || La Silla || E. W. Elst || HYG || align=right | 5.7 km || 
|-id=005 bgcolor=#E9E9E9
| 66005 ||  || — || July 22, 1998 || Reedy Creek || J. Broughton || — || align=right | 5.4 km || 
|-id=006 bgcolor=#fefefe
| 66006 ||  || — || July 26, 1998 || La Silla || E. W. Elst || — || align=right | 1.7 km || 
|-id=007 bgcolor=#E9E9E9
| 66007 || 1998 PO || — || August 3, 1998 || Majorca || Á. López J. || PAD || align=right | 11 km || 
|-id=008 bgcolor=#FFC2E0
| 66008 ||  || — || August 20, 1998 || Anderson Mesa || LONEOS || APO +1km || align=right | 1.5 km || 
|-id=009 bgcolor=#E9E9E9
| 66009 ||  || — || August 17, 1998 || Socorro || LINEAR || — || align=right | 5.0 km || 
|-id=010 bgcolor=#d6d6d6
| 66010 ||  || — || August 17, 1998 || Socorro || LINEAR || EMA || align=right | 7.7 km || 
|-id=011 bgcolor=#E9E9E9
| 66011 ||  || — || August 17, 1998 || Socorro || LINEAR || PAD || align=right | 9.8 km || 
|-id=012 bgcolor=#E9E9E9
| 66012 ||  || — || August 17, 1998 || Socorro || LINEAR || — || align=right | 4.3 km || 
|-id=013 bgcolor=#d6d6d6
| 66013 ||  || — || August 17, 1998 || Socorro || LINEAR || NAE || align=right | 12 km || 
|-id=014 bgcolor=#d6d6d6
| 66014 ||  || — || August 17, 1998 || Socorro || LINEAR || — || align=right | 4.4 km || 
|-id=015 bgcolor=#E9E9E9
| 66015 ||  || — || August 17, 1998 || Socorro || LINEAR || GEF || align=right | 3.6 km || 
|-id=016 bgcolor=#d6d6d6
| 66016 ||  || — || August 24, 1998 || Kitt Peak || Spacewatch || EMA || align=right | 11 km || 
|-id=017 bgcolor=#d6d6d6
| 66017 ||  || — || August 26, 1998 || Xinglong || SCAP || — || align=right | 5.2 km || 
|-id=018 bgcolor=#d6d6d6
| 66018 ||  || — || August 17, 1998 || Socorro || LINEAR || — || align=right | 12 km || 
|-id=019 bgcolor=#d6d6d6
| 66019 ||  || — || August 17, 1998 || Socorro || LINEAR || — || align=right | 3.6 km || 
|-id=020 bgcolor=#fefefe
| 66020 ||  || — || August 17, 1998 || Socorro || LINEAR || NYS || align=right | 1.1 km || 
|-id=021 bgcolor=#d6d6d6
| 66021 ||  || — || August 17, 1998 || Socorro || LINEAR || — || align=right | 6.3 km || 
|-id=022 bgcolor=#d6d6d6
| 66022 ||  || — || August 17, 1998 || Socorro || LINEAR || EOS || align=right | 7.3 km || 
|-id=023 bgcolor=#fefefe
| 66023 ||  || — || August 17, 1998 || Socorro || LINEAR || FLO || align=right | 1.7 km || 
|-id=024 bgcolor=#E9E9E9
| 66024 ||  || — || August 17, 1998 || Socorro || LINEAR || — || align=right | 4.1 km || 
|-id=025 bgcolor=#d6d6d6
| 66025 ||  || — || August 17, 1998 || Socorro || LINEAR || — || align=right | 6.0 km || 
|-id=026 bgcolor=#d6d6d6
| 66026 ||  || — || August 17, 1998 || Socorro || LINEAR || EOS || align=right | 5.0 km || 
|-id=027 bgcolor=#d6d6d6
| 66027 ||  || — || August 17, 1998 || Socorro || LINEAR || — || align=right | 5.3 km || 
|-id=028 bgcolor=#d6d6d6
| 66028 ||  || — || August 17, 1998 || Socorro || LINEAR || HYG || align=right | 6.0 km || 
|-id=029 bgcolor=#d6d6d6
| 66029 ||  || — || August 23, 1998 || Anderson Mesa || LONEOS || — || align=right | 5.7 km || 
|-id=030 bgcolor=#E9E9E9
| 66030 ||  || — || August 24, 1998 || Socorro || LINEAR || — || align=right | 8.2 km || 
|-id=031 bgcolor=#E9E9E9
| 66031 ||  || — || August 24, 1998 || Socorro || LINEAR || ADE || align=right | 6.5 km || 
|-id=032 bgcolor=#d6d6d6
| 66032 ||  || — || August 24, 1998 || Socorro || LINEAR || — || align=right | 10 km || 
|-id=033 bgcolor=#d6d6d6
| 66033 ||  || — || August 24, 1998 || Socorro || LINEAR || EMA || align=right | 8.0 km || 
|-id=034 bgcolor=#E9E9E9
| 66034 ||  || — || August 24, 1998 || Socorro || LINEAR || GEF || align=right | 4.0 km || 
|-id=035 bgcolor=#d6d6d6
| 66035 ||  || — || August 24, 1998 || Socorro || LINEAR || — || align=right | 6.0 km || 
|-id=036 bgcolor=#d6d6d6
| 66036 ||  || — || August 24, 1998 || Socorro || LINEAR || — || align=right | 5.7 km || 
|-id=037 bgcolor=#d6d6d6
| 66037 ||  || — || August 24, 1998 || Socorro || LINEAR || EOS || align=right | 4.7 km || 
|-id=038 bgcolor=#d6d6d6
| 66038 ||  || — || August 24, 1998 || Socorro || LINEAR || — || align=right | 6.7 km || 
|-id=039 bgcolor=#d6d6d6
| 66039 ||  || — || August 24, 1998 || Socorro || LINEAR || — || align=right | 10 km || 
|-id=040 bgcolor=#d6d6d6
| 66040 ||  || — || August 24, 1998 || Socorro || LINEAR || — || align=right | 7.3 km || 
|-id=041 bgcolor=#d6d6d6
| 66041 ||  || — || August 24, 1998 || Socorro || LINEAR || — || align=right | 9.9 km || 
|-id=042 bgcolor=#d6d6d6
| 66042 ||  || — || August 24, 1998 || Socorro || LINEAR || — || align=right | 5.7 km || 
|-id=043 bgcolor=#E9E9E9
| 66043 ||  || — || August 24, 1998 || Socorro || LINEAR || MIT || align=right | 4.4 km || 
|-id=044 bgcolor=#E9E9E9
| 66044 ||  || — || August 24, 1998 || Socorro || LINEAR || — || align=right | 6.3 km || 
|-id=045 bgcolor=#d6d6d6
| 66045 ||  || — || August 24, 1998 || Socorro || LINEAR || — || align=right | 5.2 km || 
|-id=046 bgcolor=#d6d6d6
| 66046 ||  || — || August 24, 1998 || Socorro || LINEAR || — || align=right | 7.8 km || 
|-id=047 bgcolor=#d6d6d6
| 66047 ||  || — || August 24, 1998 || Socorro || LINEAR || TIR || align=right | 7.4 km || 
|-id=048 bgcolor=#d6d6d6
| 66048 ||  || — || August 24, 1998 || Socorro || LINEAR || — || align=right | 7.0 km || 
|-id=049 bgcolor=#d6d6d6
| 66049 ||  || — || August 24, 1998 || Socorro || LINEAR || — || align=right | 8.6 km || 
|-id=050 bgcolor=#d6d6d6
| 66050 ||  || — || August 24, 1998 || Socorro || LINEAR || URS || align=right | 13 km || 
|-id=051 bgcolor=#d6d6d6
| 66051 ||  || — || August 24, 1998 || Socorro || LINEAR || EOS || align=right | 4.3 km || 
|-id=052 bgcolor=#d6d6d6
| 66052 ||  || — || August 24, 1998 || Socorro || LINEAR || — || align=right | 6.8 km || 
|-id=053 bgcolor=#d6d6d6
| 66053 ||  || — || August 24, 1998 || Socorro || LINEAR || — || align=right | 4.9 km || 
|-id=054 bgcolor=#d6d6d6
| 66054 ||  || — || August 24, 1998 || Socorro || LINEAR || — || align=right | 5.4 km || 
|-id=055 bgcolor=#d6d6d6
| 66055 ||  || — || August 28, 1998 || Socorro || LINEAR || — || align=right | 9.2 km || 
|-id=056 bgcolor=#d6d6d6
| 66056 ||  || — || August 19, 1998 || Socorro || LINEAR || — || align=right | 5.6 km || 
|-id=057 bgcolor=#d6d6d6
| 66057 ||  || — || August 19, 1998 || Socorro || LINEAR || EOS || align=right | 5.4 km || 
|-id=058 bgcolor=#d6d6d6
| 66058 ||  || — || August 24, 1998 || Socorro || LINEAR || — || align=right | 4.5 km || 
|-id=059 bgcolor=#d6d6d6
| 66059 ||  || — || August 26, 1998 || La Silla || E. W. Elst || — || align=right | 6.2 km || 
|-id=060 bgcolor=#d6d6d6
| 66060 ||  || — || August 26, 1998 || La Silla || E. W. Elst || HYG || align=right | 7.1 km || 
|-id=061 bgcolor=#fefefe
| 66061 ||  || — || August 26, 1998 || La Silla || E. W. Elst || FLO || align=right | 1.6 km || 
|-id=062 bgcolor=#d6d6d6
| 66062 ||  || — || September 10, 1998 || Višnjan Observatory || Višnjan Obs. || LIX || align=right | 12 km || 
|-id=063 bgcolor=#FFC2E0
| 66063 ||  || — || September 14, 1998 || Socorro || LINEAR || ATE +1kmmoon || align=right data-sort-value="0.96" | 960 m || 
|-id=064 bgcolor=#fefefe
| 66064 ||  || — || September 14, 1998 || Socorro || LINEAR || H || align=right | 1.2 km || 
|-id=065 bgcolor=#d6d6d6
| 66065 ||  || — || September 14, 1998 || Kitt Peak || Spacewatch || THM || align=right | 5.3 km || 
|-id=066 bgcolor=#d6d6d6
| 66066 ||  || — || September 14, 1998 || Socorro || LINEAR || JLI || align=right | 3.9 km || 
|-id=067 bgcolor=#E9E9E9
| 66067 ||  || — || September 14, 1998 || Socorro || LINEAR || — || align=right | 5.4 km || 
|-id=068 bgcolor=#E9E9E9
| 66068 ||  || — || September 14, 1998 || Socorro || LINEAR || — || align=right | 5.0 km || 
|-id=069 bgcolor=#d6d6d6
| 66069 ||  || — || September 14, 1998 || Socorro || LINEAR || — || align=right | 7.7 km || 
|-id=070 bgcolor=#fefefe
| 66070 ||  || — || September 14, 1998 || Socorro || LINEAR || — || align=right | 2.2 km || 
|-id=071 bgcolor=#d6d6d6
| 66071 ||  || — || September 14, 1998 || Socorro || LINEAR || — || align=right | 6.5 km || 
|-id=072 bgcolor=#d6d6d6
| 66072 ||  || — || September 14, 1998 || Socorro || LINEAR || — || align=right | 5.7 km || 
|-id=073 bgcolor=#d6d6d6
| 66073 ||  || — || September 14, 1998 || Socorro || LINEAR || — || align=right | 7.7 km || 
|-id=074 bgcolor=#d6d6d6
| 66074 ||  || — || September 14, 1998 || Socorro || LINEAR || TIR || align=right | 7.6 km || 
|-id=075 bgcolor=#d6d6d6
| 66075 ||  || — || September 14, 1998 || Socorro || LINEAR || — || align=right | 7.6 km || 
|-id=076 bgcolor=#d6d6d6
| 66076 ||  || — || September 14, 1998 || Socorro || LINEAR || EOS || align=right | 7.8 km || 
|-id=077 bgcolor=#d6d6d6
| 66077 ||  || — || September 14, 1998 || Socorro || LINEAR || EOS || align=right | 5.0 km || 
|-id=078 bgcolor=#d6d6d6
| 66078 ||  || — || September 14, 1998 || Socorro || LINEAR || — || align=right | 10 km || 
|-id=079 bgcolor=#d6d6d6
| 66079 ||  || — || September 14, 1998 || Socorro || LINEAR || — || align=right | 7.0 km || 
|-id=080 bgcolor=#d6d6d6
| 66080 ||  || — || September 14, 1998 || Socorro || LINEAR || HYG || align=right | 7.4 km || 
|-id=081 bgcolor=#d6d6d6
| 66081 ||  || — || September 14, 1998 || Socorro || LINEAR || — || align=right | 7.1 km || 
|-id=082 bgcolor=#d6d6d6
| 66082 ||  || — || September 14, 1998 || Socorro || LINEAR || — || align=right | 7.7 km || 
|-id=083 bgcolor=#d6d6d6
| 66083 ||  || — || September 14, 1998 || Socorro || LINEAR || — || align=right | 4.3 km || 
|-id=084 bgcolor=#d6d6d6
| 66084 ||  || — || September 14, 1998 || Socorro || LINEAR || VER || align=right | 6.8 km || 
|-id=085 bgcolor=#d6d6d6
| 66085 ||  || — || September 14, 1998 || Socorro || LINEAR || HYG || align=right | 8.3 km || 
|-id=086 bgcolor=#d6d6d6
| 66086 ||  || — || September 14, 1998 || Socorro || LINEAR || — || align=right | 7.5 km || 
|-id=087 bgcolor=#d6d6d6
| 66087 ||  || — || September 14, 1998 || Socorro || LINEAR || — || align=right | 5.4 km || 
|-id=088 bgcolor=#d6d6d6
| 66088 ||  || — || September 14, 1998 || Socorro || LINEAR || — || align=right | 4.7 km || 
|-id=089 bgcolor=#d6d6d6
| 66089 ||  || — || September 14, 1998 || Socorro || LINEAR || — || align=right | 6.9 km || 
|-id=090 bgcolor=#d6d6d6
| 66090 ||  || — || September 14, 1998 || Socorro || LINEAR || — || align=right | 4.7 km || 
|-id=091 bgcolor=#d6d6d6
| 66091 ||  || — || September 14, 1998 || Socorro || LINEAR || — || align=right | 5.9 km || 
|-id=092 bgcolor=#fefefe
| 66092 || 1998 SD || — || September 16, 1998 || Catalina || CSS || Hslow || align=right | 2.0 km || 
|-id=093 bgcolor=#E9E9E9
| 66093 || 1998 SG || — || September 16, 1998 || Kitt Peak || Spacewatch || — || align=right | 8.7 km || 
|-id=094 bgcolor=#d6d6d6
| 66094 ||  || — || September 17, 1998 || Caussols || ODAS || — || align=right | 5.2 km || 
|-id=095 bgcolor=#d6d6d6
| 66095 ||  || — || September 20, 1998 || Kitt Peak || Spacewatch || — || align=right | 4.7 km || 
|-id=096 bgcolor=#d6d6d6
| 66096 ||  || — || September 20, 1998 || Kitt Peak || Spacewatch || BRA || align=right | 3.1 km || 
|-id=097 bgcolor=#d6d6d6
| 66097 ||  || — || September 17, 1998 || Caussols || ODAS || — || align=right | 7.9 km || 
|-id=098 bgcolor=#d6d6d6
| 66098 ||  || — || September 23, 1998 || Catalina || CSS || EUP || align=right | 11 km || 
|-id=099 bgcolor=#d6d6d6
| 66099 ||  || — || September 23, 1998 || Caussols || ODAS || THM || align=right | 7.4 km || 
|-id=100 bgcolor=#d6d6d6
| 66100 ||  || — || September 17, 1998 || Kitt Peak || Spacewatch || THM || align=right | 6.1 km || 
|}

66101–66200 

|-bgcolor=#d6d6d6
| 66101 ||  || — || September 23, 1998 || Višnjan Observatory || Višnjan Obs. || HYG || align=right | 7.0 km || 
|-id=102 bgcolor=#d6d6d6
| 66102 ||  || — || September 23, 1998 || Višnjan Observatory || Višnjan Obs. || — || align=right | 7.9 km || 
|-id=103 bgcolor=#d6d6d6
| 66103 ||  || — || September 17, 1998 || Anderson Mesa || LONEOS || — || align=right | 5.7 km || 
|-id=104 bgcolor=#fefefe
| 66104 ||  || — || September 19, 1998 || Anderson Mesa || LONEOS || — || align=right | 1.8 km || 
|-id=105 bgcolor=#d6d6d6
| 66105 ||  || — || September 22, 1998 || Anderson Mesa || LONEOS || — || align=right | 6.5 km || 
|-id=106 bgcolor=#d6d6d6
| 66106 ||  || — || September 22, 1998 || Anderson Mesa || LONEOS || MEL || align=right | 9.6 km || 
|-id=107 bgcolor=#fefefe
| 66107 ||  || — || September 24, 1998 || Catalina || CSS || H || align=right | 1.7 km || 
|-id=108 bgcolor=#fefefe
| 66108 ||  || — || September 26, 1998 || Socorro || LINEAR || H || align=right | 1.6 km || 
|-id=109 bgcolor=#fefefe
| 66109 ||  || — || September 26, 1998 || Socorro || LINEAR || H || align=right | 1.8 km || 
|-id=110 bgcolor=#d6d6d6
| 66110 ||  || — || September 21, 1998 || Kitt Peak || Spacewatch || — || align=right | 5.0 km || 
|-id=111 bgcolor=#fefefe
| 66111 ||  || — || September 23, 1998 || Kitt Peak || Spacewatch || V || align=right | 1.6 km || 
|-id=112 bgcolor=#fefefe
| 66112 ||  || — || September 25, 1998 || Kitt Peak || Spacewatch || — || align=right | 1.3 km || 
|-id=113 bgcolor=#d6d6d6
| 66113 ||  || — || September 16, 1998 || Anderson Mesa || LONEOS || — || align=right | 6.1 km || 
|-id=114 bgcolor=#d6d6d6
| 66114 ||  || — || September 19, 1998 || Socorro || LINEAR || URS || align=right | 6.9 km || 
|-id=115 bgcolor=#d6d6d6
| 66115 ||  || — || September 19, 1998 || Socorro || LINEAR || — || align=right | 8.3 km || 
|-id=116 bgcolor=#d6d6d6
| 66116 ||  || — || September 19, 1998 || Socorro || LINEAR || ALA || align=right | 13 km || 
|-id=117 bgcolor=#fefefe
| 66117 ||  || — || September 21, 1998 || Socorro || LINEAR || — || align=right | 1.7 km || 
|-id=118 bgcolor=#d6d6d6
| 66118 ||  || — || September 21, 1998 || La Silla || E. W. Elst || — || align=right | 6.2 km || 
|-id=119 bgcolor=#d6d6d6
| 66119 ||  || — || September 21, 1998 || La Silla || E. W. Elst || — || align=right | 7.2 km || 
|-id=120 bgcolor=#fefefe
| 66120 ||  || — || September 21, 1998 || La Silla || E. W. Elst || — || align=right | 1.9 km || 
|-id=121 bgcolor=#d6d6d6
| 66121 ||  || — || September 26, 1998 || Socorro || LINEAR || EOS || align=right | 3.9 km || 
|-id=122 bgcolor=#E9E9E9
| 66122 ||  || — || September 26, 1998 || Socorro || LINEAR || — || align=right | 3.6 km || 
|-id=123 bgcolor=#d6d6d6
| 66123 ||  || — || September 26, 1998 || Socorro || LINEAR || — || align=right | 7.0 km || 
|-id=124 bgcolor=#d6d6d6
| 66124 ||  || — || September 26, 1998 || Socorro || LINEAR || — || align=right | 6.5 km || 
|-id=125 bgcolor=#d6d6d6
| 66125 ||  || — || September 26, 1998 || Socorro || LINEAR || HYG || align=right | 9.6 km || 
|-id=126 bgcolor=#E9E9E9
| 66126 ||  || — || September 26, 1998 || Socorro || LINEAR || — || align=right | 4.6 km || 
|-id=127 bgcolor=#d6d6d6
| 66127 ||  || — || September 26, 1998 || Socorro || LINEAR || — || align=right | 5.1 km || 
|-id=128 bgcolor=#d6d6d6
| 66128 ||  || — || September 26, 1998 || Socorro || LINEAR || THM || align=right | 6.2 km || 
|-id=129 bgcolor=#d6d6d6
| 66129 ||  || — || September 26, 1998 || Socorro || LINEAR || EOS || align=right | 4.2 km || 
|-id=130 bgcolor=#d6d6d6
| 66130 ||  || — || September 26, 1998 || Socorro || LINEAR || URS || align=right | 9.9 km || 
|-id=131 bgcolor=#d6d6d6
| 66131 ||  || — || September 26, 1998 || Socorro || LINEAR || THM || align=right | 5.8 km || 
|-id=132 bgcolor=#d6d6d6
| 66132 ||  || — || September 26, 1998 || Socorro || LINEAR || EOS || align=right | 5.0 km || 
|-id=133 bgcolor=#d6d6d6
| 66133 ||  || — || September 26, 1998 || Socorro || LINEAR || EOS || align=right | 6.7 km || 
|-id=134 bgcolor=#d6d6d6
| 66134 ||  || — || September 26, 1998 || Socorro || LINEAR || — || align=right | 5.1 km || 
|-id=135 bgcolor=#d6d6d6
| 66135 ||  || — || September 26, 1998 || Socorro || LINEAR || — || align=right | 4.7 km || 
|-id=136 bgcolor=#d6d6d6
| 66136 ||  || — || September 26, 1998 || Socorro || LINEAR || — || align=right | 6.5 km || 
|-id=137 bgcolor=#fefefe
| 66137 ||  || — || September 26, 1998 || Socorro || LINEAR || — || align=right | 2.7 km || 
|-id=138 bgcolor=#d6d6d6
| 66138 ||  || — || September 26, 1998 || Socorro || LINEAR || HYG || align=right | 9.1 km || 
|-id=139 bgcolor=#d6d6d6
| 66139 ||  || — || September 26, 1998 || Socorro || LINEAR || — || align=right | 5.2 km || 
|-id=140 bgcolor=#d6d6d6
| 66140 ||  || — || September 26, 1998 || Socorro || LINEAR || EOS || align=right | 7.1 km || 
|-id=141 bgcolor=#fefefe
| 66141 ||  || — || September 26, 1998 || Socorro || LINEAR || FLO || align=right | 2.0 km || 
|-id=142 bgcolor=#fefefe
| 66142 ||  || — || September 20, 1998 || La Silla || E. W. Elst || NYS || align=right | 1.6 km || 
|-id=143 bgcolor=#d6d6d6
| 66143 ||  || — || September 26, 1998 || Socorro || LINEAR || EOS || align=right | 6.1 km || 
|-id=144 bgcolor=#E9E9E9
| 66144 ||  || — || September 18, 1998 || Caussols || ODAS || — || align=right | 1.6 km || 
|-id=145 bgcolor=#d6d6d6
| 66145 || 1998 TM || — || October 10, 1998 || Oizumi || T. Kobayashi || — || align=right | 4.6 km || 
|-id=146 bgcolor=#FFC2E0
| 66146 ||  || — || October 13, 1998 || Socorro || LINEAR || ATE +1km || align=right | 2.9 km || 
|-id=147 bgcolor=#d6d6d6
| 66147 ||  || — || October 12, 1998 || Kitt Peak || Spacewatch || THM || align=right | 8.6 km || 
|-id=148 bgcolor=#E9E9E9
| 66148 ||  || — || October 12, 1998 || Kitt Peak || Spacewatch || AGN || align=right | 2.9 km || 
|-id=149 bgcolor=#d6d6d6
| 66149 ||  || — || October 14, 1998 || Anderson Mesa || LONEOS || THM || align=right | 7.9 km || 
|-id=150 bgcolor=#fefefe
| 66150 || 1998 UF || — || October 17, 1998 || Catalina || CSS || H || align=right | 2.2 km || 
|-id=151 bgcolor=#d6d6d6
| 66151 Josefhanuš || 1998 UL ||  || October 16, 1998 || Ondřejov || P. Pravec || EOS || align=right | 6.2 km || 
|-id=152 bgcolor=#fefefe
| 66152 || 1998 UU || — || October 16, 1998 || Catalina || CSS || H || align=right | 1.5 km || 
|-id=153 bgcolor=#fefefe
| 66153 || 1998 UV || — || October 16, 1998 || Catalina || CSS || H || align=right | 1.3 km || 
|-id=154 bgcolor=#fefefe
| 66154 ||  || — || October 28, 1998 || Socorro || LINEAR || H || align=right | 1.0 km || 
|-id=155 bgcolor=#d6d6d6
| 66155 ||  || — || October 18, 1998 || Anderson Mesa || LONEOS || — || align=right | 6.0 km || 
|-id=156 bgcolor=#E9E9E9
| 66156 ||  || — || October 18, 1998 || La Silla || E. W. Elst || — || align=right | 3.4 km || 
|-id=157 bgcolor=#d6d6d6
| 66157 ||  || — || October 18, 1998 || La Silla || E. W. Elst || HYG || align=right | 5.9 km || 
|-id=158 bgcolor=#d6d6d6
| 66158 ||  || — || October 18, 1998 || La Silla || E. W. Elst || — || align=right | 6.9 km || 
|-id=159 bgcolor=#d6d6d6
| 66159 ||  || — || October 28, 1998 || Socorro || LINEAR || — || align=right | 8.1 km || 
|-id=160 bgcolor=#E9E9E9
| 66160 ||  || — || October 28, 1998 || Socorro || LINEAR || GEF || align=right | 3.8 km || 
|-id=161 bgcolor=#d6d6d6
| 66161 ||  || — || October 28, 1998 || Socorro || LINEAR || HYG || align=right | 7.1 km || 
|-id=162 bgcolor=#E9E9E9
| 66162 ||  || — || October 18, 1998 || Anderson Mesa || LONEOS || — || align=right | 4.3 km || 
|-id=163 bgcolor=#fefefe
| 66163 || 1998 VB || — || November 7, 1998 || Oizumi || T. Kobayashi || — || align=right | 2.2 km || 
|-id=164 bgcolor=#d6d6d6
| 66164 ||  || — || November 10, 1998 || Socorro || LINEAR || — || align=right | 5.7 km || 
|-id=165 bgcolor=#fefefe
| 66165 ||  || — || November 10, 1998 || Socorro || LINEAR || — || align=right | 1.9 km || 
|-id=166 bgcolor=#fefefe
| 66166 ||  || — || November 10, 1998 || Socorro || LINEAR || — || align=right | 1.6 km || 
|-id=167 bgcolor=#d6d6d6
| 66167 ||  || — || November 10, 1998 || Socorro || LINEAR || MEL || align=right | 11 km || 
|-id=168 bgcolor=#fefefe
| 66168 ||  || — || November 10, 1998 || Socorro || LINEAR || — || align=right | 2.3 km || 
|-id=169 bgcolor=#d6d6d6
| 66169 ||  || — || November 10, 1998 || Socorro || LINEAR || — || align=right | 6.9 km || 
|-id=170 bgcolor=#d6d6d6
| 66170 ||  || — || November 10, 1998 || Socorro || LINEAR || — || align=right | 15 km || 
|-id=171 bgcolor=#d6d6d6
| 66171 ||  || — || November 10, 1998 || Socorro || LINEAR || — || align=right | 7.2 km || 
|-id=172 bgcolor=#d6d6d6
| 66172 ||  || — || November 14, 1998 || Anderson Mesa || LONEOS || — || align=right | 8.4 km || 
|-id=173 bgcolor=#d6d6d6
| 66173 ||  || — || November 11, 1998 || Socorro || LINEAR || — || align=right | 8.0 km || 
|-id=174 bgcolor=#d6d6d6
| 66174 ||  || — || November 14, 1998 || Socorro || LINEAR || ALA || align=right | 11 km || 
|-id=175 bgcolor=#fefefe
| 66175 ||  || — || November 20, 1998 || Majorca || Á. López J., R. Pacheco || NYS || align=right | 2.4 km || 
|-id=176 bgcolor=#fefefe
| 66176 ||  || — || November 18, 1998 || Catalina || CSS || H || align=right | 1.8 km || 
|-id=177 bgcolor=#d6d6d6
| 66177 ||  || — || November 21, 1998 || Goodricke-Pigott || R. A. Tucker || — || align=right | 7.1 km || 
|-id=178 bgcolor=#d6d6d6
| 66178 ||  || — || November 21, 1998 || Socorro || LINEAR || — || align=right | 14 km || 
|-id=179 bgcolor=#fefefe
| 66179 ||  || — || November 21, 1998 || Socorro || LINEAR || — || align=right | 1.5 km || 
|-id=180 bgcolor=#E9E9E9
| 66180 ||  || — || November 21, 1998 || Socorro || LINEAR || AGN || align=right | 2.8 km || 
|-id=181 bgcolor=#fefefe
| 66181 ||  || — || November 21, 1998 || Socorro || LINEAR || NYS || align=right | 3.2 km || 
|-id=182 bgcolor=#E9E9E9
| 66182 ||  || — || November 18, 1998 || Socorro || LINEAR || — || align=right | 2.2 km || 
|-id=183 bgcolor=#d6d6d6
| 66183 ||  || — || November 23, 1998 || Anderson Mesa || LONEOS || — || align=right | 7.8 km || 
|-id=184 bgcolor=#fefefe
| 66184 ||  || — || December 9, 1998 || Socorro || LINEAR || — || align=right | 2.2 km || 
|-id=185 bgcolor=#d6d6d6
| 66185 ||  || — || December 14, 1998 || Socorro || LINEAR || — || align=right | 12 km || 
|-id=186 bgcolor=#E9E9E9
| 66186 ||  || — || December 14, 1998 || Socorro || LINEAR || EUN || align=right | 4.0 km || 
|-id=187 bgcolor=#d6d6d6
| 66187 ||  || — || December 14, 1998 || Socorro || LINEAR || HIL3:2 || align=right | 22 km || 
|-id=188 bgcolor=#d6d6d6
| 66188 ||  || — || December 15, 1998 || Socorro || LINEAR || — || align=right | 10 km || 
|-id=189 bgcolor=#fefefe
| 66189 ||  || — || December 12, 1998 || Mérida || O. A. Naranjo || V || align=right | 1.7 km || 
|-id=190 bgcolor=#fefefe
| 66190 ||  || — || December 22, 1998 || Farra d'Isonzo || Farra d'Isonzo || V || align=right | 1.7 km || 
|-id=191 bgcolor=#d6d6d6
| 66191 ||  || — || December 19, 1998 || Uenohara || N. Kawasato || THM || align=right | 11 km || 
|-id=192 bgcolor=#fefefe
| 66192 ||  || — || December 18, 1998 || Caussols || ODAS || — || align=right | 1.8 km || 
|-id=193 bgcolor=#E9E9E9
| 66193 ||  || — || January 13, 1999 || Xinglong || SCAP || — || align=right | 2.7 km || 
|-id=194 bgcolor=#fefefe
| 66194 ||  || — || January 14, 1999 || Anderson Mesa || LONEOS || PHO || align=right | 3.0 km || 
|-id=195 bgcolor=#fefefe
| 66195 ||  || — || January 14, 1999 || Socorro || LINEAR || H || align=right | 1.7 km || 
|-id=196 bgcolor=#fefefe
| 66196 ||  || — || January 13, 1999 || Anderson Mesa || LONEOS || — || align=right | 2.2 km || 
|-id=197 bgcolor=#fefefe
| 66197 ||  || — || January 20, 1999 || Caussols || ODAS || — || align=right | 4.0 km || 
|-id=198 bgcolor=#fefefe
| 66198 ||  || — || January 20, 1999 || Caussols || ODAS || — || align=right | 2.4 km || 
|-id=199 bgcolor=#fefefe
| 66199 ||  || — || January 24, 1999 || Višnjan Observatory || K. Korlević || — || align=right | 2.8 km || 
|-id=200 bgcolor=#fefefe
| 66200 ||  || — || January 20, 1999 || Caussols || ODAS || — || align=right | 3.7 km || 
|}

66201–66300 

|-bgcolor=#E9E9E9
| 66201 ||  || — || January 16, 1999 || Socorro || LINEAR || MAR || align=right | 3.7 km || 
|-id=202 bgcolor=#E9E9E9
| 66202 ||  || — || January 16, 1999 || Socorro || LINEAR || MAR || align=right | 5.7 km || 
|-id=203 bgcolor=#d6d6d6
| 66203 ||  || — || January 18, 1999 || Socorro || LINEAR || — || align=right | 5.7 km || 
|-id=204 bgcolor=#fefefe
| 66204 ||  || — || January 28, 1999 || Gekko || T. Kagawa || PHO || align=right | 2.2 km || 
|-id=205 bgcolor=#E9E9E9
| 66205 ||  || — || January 16, 1999 || Kitt Peak || Spacewatch || — || align=right | 5.0 km || 
|-id=206 bgcolor=#fefefe
| 66206 ||  || — || January 19, 1999 || Kitt Peak || Spacewatch || — || align=right | 1.6 km || 
|-id=207 bgcolor=#d6d6d6
| 66207 Carpi ||  ||  || February 6, 1999 || Cavezzo || Cavezzo Obs. || — || align=right | 5.8 km || 
|-id=208 bgcolor=#fefefe
| 66208 ||  || — || February 10, 1999 || Socorro || LINEAR || — || align=right | 1.4 km || 
|-id=209 bgcolor=#E9E9E9
| 66209 ||  || — || February 12, 1999 || Uenohara || N. Kawasato || — || align=right | 2.8 km || 
|-id=210 bgcolor=#E9E9E9
| 66210 ||  || — || February 15, 1999 || Višnjan Observatory || K. Korlević || EUN || align=right | 5.0 km || 
|-id=211 bgcolor=#d6d6d6
| 66211 ||  || — || February 10, 1999 || Socorro || LINEAR || MEL || align=right | 7.7 km || 
|-id=212 bgcolor=#fefefe
| 66212 ||  || — || February 10, 1999 || Socorro || LINEAR || FLO || align=right | 2.9 km || 
|-id=213 bgcolor=#E9E9E9
| 66213 ||  || — || February 10, 1999 || Socorro || LINEAR || MIS || align=right | 5.9 km || 
|-id=214 bgcolor=#E9E9E9
| 66214 ||  || — || February 10, 1999 || Socorro || LINEAR || ADE || align=right | 5.9 km || 
|-id=215 bgcolor=#d6d6d6
| 66215 ||  || — || February 10, 1999 || Socorro || LINEAR || THM || align=right | 7.3 km || 
|-id=216 bgcolor=#d6d6d6
| 66216 ||  || — || February 10, 1999 || Socorro || LINEAR || KOR || align=right | 4.1 km || 
|-id=217 bgcolor=#fefefe
| 66217 ||  || — || February 10, 1999 || Socorro || LINEAR || — || align=right | 1.8 km || 
|-id=218 bgcolor=#d6d6d6
| 66218 ||  || — || February 10, 1999 || Socorro || LINEAR || EOS || align=right | 6.9 km || 
|-id=219 bgcolor=#E9E9E9
| 66219 ||  || — || February 10, 1999 || Socorro || LINEAR || — || align=right | 6.4 km || 
|-id=220 bgcolor=#fefefe
| 66220 ||  || — || February 12, 1999 || Socorro || LINEAR || V || align=right | 1.6 km || 
|-id=221 bgcolor=#fefefe
| 66221 ||  || — || February 12, 1999 || Socorro || LINEAR || — || align=right | 3.3 km || 
|-id=222 bgcolor=#d6d6d6
| 66222 ||  || — || February 12, 1999 || Socorro || LINEAR || EOS || align=right | 6.9 km || 
|-id=223 bgcolor=#E9E9E9
| 66223 ||  || — || February 12, 1999 || Socorro || LINEAR || MAR || align=right | 4.3 km || 
|-id=224 bgcolor=#fefefe
| 66224 ||  || — || February 12, 1999 || Socorro || LINEAR || — || align=right | 1.5 km || 
|-id=225 bgcolor=#fefefe
| 66225 ||  || — || February 12, 1999 || Socorro || LINEAR || — || align=right | 2.5 km || 
|-id=226 bgcolor=#fefefe
| 66226 ||  || — || February 10, 1999 || Socorro || LINEAR || — || align=right | 2.7 km || 
|-id=227 bgcolor=#d6d6d6
| 66227 ||  || — || February 12, 1999 || Socorro || LINEAR || HIL3:2 || align=right | 11 km || 
|-id=228 bgcolor=#fefefe
| 66228 ||  || — || February 12, 1999 || Socorro || LINEAR || V || align=right | 1.7 km || 
|-id=229 bgcolor=#fefefe
| 66229 ||  || — || February 12, 1999 || Socorro || LINEAR || — || align=right | 3.2 km || 
|-id=230 bgcolor=#d6d6d6
| 66230 ||  || — || February 12, 1999 || Socorro || LINEAR || — || align=right | 5.7 km || 
|-id=231 bgcolor=#E9E9E9
| 66231 ||  || — || February 11, 1999 || Socorro || LINEAR || — || align=right | 3.7 km || 
|-id=232 bgcolor=#fefefe
| 66232 ||  || — || February 8, 1999 || Kitt Peak || Spacewatch || — || align=right | 1.7 km || 
|-id=233 bgcolor=#fefefe
| 66233 ||  || — || February 14, 1999 || Anderson Mesa || LONEOS || — || align=right | 2.0 km || 
|-id=234 bgcolor=#fefefe
| 66234 ||  || — || February 9, 1999 || Kitt Peak || Spacewatch || — || align=right | 2.7 km || 
|-id=235 bgcolor=#fefefe
| 66235 || 1999 ET || — || March 6, 1999 || Kitt Peak || Spacewatch || FLO || align=right | 1.5 km || 
|-id=236 bgcolor=#fefefe
| 66236 ||  || — || March 14, 1999 || Reedy Creek || J. Broughton || — || align=right | 3.1 km || 
|-id=237 bgcolor=#E9E9E9
| 66237 ||  || — || March 13, 1999 || Goodricke-Pigott || R. A. Tucker || — || align=right | 5.2 km || 
|-id=238 bgcolor=#fefefe
| 66238 || 1999 FZ || — || March 17, 1999 || Caussols || ODAS || — || align=right | 3.2 km || 
|-id=239 bgcolor=#d6d6d6
| 66239 ||  || — || March 16, 1999 || Kitt Peak || Spacewatch || NAE || align=right | 6.2 km || 
|-id=240 bgcolor=#fefefe
| 66240 ||  || — || March 20, 1999 || Anderson Mesa || LONEOS || — || align=right | 3.1 km || 
|-id=241 bgcolor=#E9E9E9
| 66241 ||  || — || March 23, 1999 || Kitt Peak || Spacewatch || — || align=right | 3.5 km || 
|-id=242 bgcolor=#E9E9E9
| 66242 ||  || — || March 23, 1999 || Kitt Peak || Spacewatch || — || align=right | 5.5 km || 
|-id=243 bgcolor=#fefefe
| 66243 ||  || — || March 19, 1999 || Socorro || LINEAR || FLO || align=right | 2.4 km || 
|-id=244 bgcolor=#fefefe
| 66244 ||  || — || March 19, 1999 || Socorro || LINEAR || — || align=right | 1.5 km || 
|-id=245 bgcolor=#fefefe
| 66245 ||  || — || March 19, 1999 || Socorro || LINEAR || V || align=right | 1.9 km || 
|-id=246 bgcolor=#fefefe
| 66246 ||  || — || March 19, 1999 || Socorro || LINEAR || FLO || align=right | 1.5 km || 
|-id=247 bgcolor=#fefefe
| 66247 ||  || — || March 19, 1999 || Socorro || LINEAR || FLO || align=right | 2.6 km || 
|-id=248 bgcolor=#E9E9E9
| 66248 ||  || — || March 20, 1999 || Socorro || LINEAR || — || align=right | 5.1 km || 
|-id=249 bgcolor=#fefefe
| 66249 ||  || — || March 20, 1999 || Socorro || LINEAR || FLO || align=right | 2.5 km || 
|-id=250 bgcolor=#E9E9E9
| 66250 || 1999 GZ || — || April 4, 1999 || San Marcello || M. Tombelli, A. Boattini || ADE || align=right | 5.4 km || 
|-id=251 bgcolor=#FFC2E0
| 66251 ||  || — || April 7, 1999 || Socorro || LINEAR || AMO +1km || align=right | 1.2 km || 
|-id=252 bgcolor=#fefefe
| 66252 ||  || — || April 6, 1999 || Višnjan Observatory || K. Korlević || — || align=right | 3.2 km || 
|-id=253 bgcolor=#FFC2E0
| 66253 ||  || — || April 9, 1999 || Socorro || LINEAR || APO || align=right data-sort-value="0.74" | 740 m || 
|-id=254 bgcolor=#fefefe
| 66254 ||  || — || April 15, 1999 || Socorro || LINEAR || — || align=right | 3.0 km || 
|-id=255 bgcolor=#fefefe
| 66255 ||  || — || April 7, 1999 || Socorro || LINEAR || NYS || align=right | 1.4 km || 
|-id=256 bgcolor=#fefefe
| 66256 ||  || — || April 12, 1999 || Socorro || LINEAR || FLO || align=right | 2.4 km || 
|-id=257 bgcolor=#fefefe
| 66257 ||  || — || April 12, 1999 || Socorro || LINEAR || — || align=right | 3.2 km || 
|-id=258 bgcolor=#fefefe
| 66258 ||  || — || April 6, 1999 || Socorro || LINEAR || ERI || align=right | 5.4 km || 
|-id=259 bgcolor=#fefefe
| 66259 ||  || — || April 7, 1999 || Socorro || LINEAR || NYS || align=right | 5.1 km || 
|-id=260 bgcolor=#fefefe
| 66260 ||  || — || April 7, 1999 || Socorro || LINEAR || FLO || align=right | 2.2 km || 
|-id=261 bgcolor=#fefefe
| 66261 ||  || — || April 12, 1999 || Socorro || LINEAR || — || align=right | 2.8 km || 
|-id=262 bgcolor=#fefefe
| 66262 ||  || — || April 10, 1999 || Anderson Mesa || LONEOS || NYS || align=right | 4.4 km || 
|-id=263 bgcolor=#E9E9E9
| 66263 ||  || — || April 12, 1999 || Socorro || LINEAR || — || align=right | 4.4 km || 
|-id=264 bgcolor=#fefefe
| 66264 || 1999 HR || — || April 18, 1999 || Reedy Creek || J. Broughton || — || align=right | 1.5 km || 
|-id=265 bgcolor=#fefefe
| 66265 ||  || — || April 19, 1999 || Kitt Peak || Spacewatch || — || align=right | 1.9 km || 
|-id=266 bgcolor=#fefefe
| 66266 ||  || — || April 17, 1999 || Socorro || LINEAR || — || align=right | 2.0 km || 
|-id=267 bgcolor=#fefefe
| 66267 ||  || — || May 8, 1999 || Catalina || CSS || — || align=right | 1.8 km || 
|-id=268 bgcolor=#fefefe
| 66268 ||  || — || May 7, 1999 || Nachi-Katsuura || Y. Shimizu, T. Urata || V || align=right | 3.0 km || 
|-id=269 bgcolor=#FA8072
| 66269 ||  || — || May 6, 1999 || Socorro || LINEAR || PHO || align=right | 3.7 km || 
|-id=270 bgcolor=#fefefe
| 66270 ||  || — || May 10, 1999 || Socorro || LINEAR || PHO || align=right | 2.6 km || 
|-id=271 bgcolor=#fefefe
| 66271 ||  || — || May 10, 1999 || Socorro || LINEAR || — || align=right | 2.3 km || 
|-id=272 bgcolor=#FFC2E0
| 66272 ||  || — || May 13, 1999 || Socorro || LINEAR || AMO +1km || align=right data-sort-value="0.81" | 810 m || 
|-id=273 bgcolor=#fefefe
| 66273 ||  || — || May 13, 1999 || Reedy Creek || J. Broughton || NYS || align=right | 1.4 km || 
|-id=274 bgcolor=#E9E9E9
| 66274 ||  || — || May 14, 1999 || Reedy Creek || J. Broughton || — || align=right | 4.7 km || 
|-id=275 bgcolor=#fefefe
| 66275 ||  || — || May 15, 1999 || Fountain Hills || C. W. Juels || — || align=right | 1.3 km || 
|-id=276 bgcolor=#fefefe
| 66276 ||  || — || May 7, 1999 || Catalina || CSS || — || align=right | 3.4 km || 
|-id=277 bgcolor=#fefefe
| 66277 ||  || — || May 14, 1999 || Socorro || LINEAR || — || align=right | 2.1 km || 
|-id=278 bgcolor=#fefefe
| 66278 ||  || — || May 9, 1999 || Višnjan Observatory || K. Korlević || NYS || align=right | 1.9 km || 
|-id=279 bgcolor=#fefefe
| 66279 ||  || — || May 12, 1999 || Woomera || F. B. Zoltowski || — || align=right | 2.5 km || 
|-id=280 bgcolor=#fefefe
| 66280 ||  || — || May 14, 1999 || Socorro || LINEAR || PHO || align=right | 2.5 km || 
|-id=281 bgcolor=#fefefe
| 66281 ||  || — || May 14, 1999 || Catalina || CSS || — || align=right | 2.3 km || 
|-id=282 bgcolor=#fefefe
| 66282 ||  || — || May 9, 1999 || Višnjan Observatory || K. Korlević || — || align=right | 2.5 km || 
|-id=283 bgcolor=#fefefe
| 66283 ||  || — || May 10, 1999 || Socorro || LINEAR || — || align=right | 5.2 km || 
|-id=284 bgcolor=#fefefe
| 66284 ||  || — || May 10, 1999 || Socorro || LINEAR || FLO || align=right | 4.8 km || 
|-id=285 bgcolor=#fefefe
| 66285 ||  || — || May 10, 1999 || Socorro || LINEAR || V || align=right | 1.2 km || 
|-id=286 bgcolor=#fefefe
| 66286 ||  || — || May 10, 1999 || Socorro || LINEAR || — || align=right | 2.1 km || 
|-id=287 bgcolor=#fefefe
| 66287 ||  || — || May 10, 1999 || Socorro || LINEAR || — || align=right | 2.6 km || 
|-id=288 bgcolor=#fefefe
| 66288 ||  || — || May 10, 1999 || Socorro || LINEAR || FLO || align=right | 2.6 km || 
|-id=289 bgcolor=#fefefe
| 66289 ||  || — || May 10, 1999 || Socorro || LINEAR || NYS || align=right | 5.8 km || 
|-id=290 bgcolor=#fefefe
| 66290 ||  || — || May 10, 1999 || Socorro || LINEAR || — || align=right | 1.7 km || 
|-id=291 bgcolor=#fefefe
| 66291 ||  || — || May 10, 1999 || Socorro || LINEAR || V || align=right | 1.9 km || 
|-id=292 bgcolor=#fefefe
| 66292 ||  || — || May 10, 1999 || Socorro || LINEAR || V || align=right | 1.9 km || 
|-id=293 bgcolor=#fefefe
| 66293 ||  || — || May 10, 1999 || Socorro || LINEAR || — || align=right | 2.1 km || 
|-id=294 bgcolor=#FA8072
| 66294 ||  || — || May 10, 1999 || Socorro || LINEAR || — || align=right | 2.4 km || 
|-id=295 bgcolor=#fefefe
| 66295 ||  || — || May 10, 1999 || Socorro || LINEAR || — || align=right | 2.7 km || 
|-id=296 bgcolor=#fefefe
| 66296 ||  || — || May 10, 1999 || Socorro || LINEAR || — || align=right | 2.5 km || 
|-id=297 bgcolor=#fefefe
| 66297 ||  || — || May 10, 1999 || Socorro || LINEAR || FLO || align=right | 1.7 km || 
|-id=298 bgcolor=#fefefe
| 66298 ||  || — || May 10, 1999 || Socorro || LINEAR || — || align=right | 3.6 km || 
|-id=299 bgcolor=#fefefe
| 66299 ||  || — || May 10, 1999 || Socorro || LINEAR || — || align=right | 2.6 km || 
|-id=300 bgcolor=#fefefe
| 66300 ||  || — || May 10, 1999 || Socorro || LINEAR || — || align=right | 2.7 km || 
|}

66301–66400 

|-bgcolor=#fefefe
| 66301 ||  || — || May 10, 1999 || Socorro || LINEAR || NYS || align=right | 1.4 km || 
|-id=302 bgcolor=#d6d6d6
| 66302 ||  || — || May 10, 1999 || Socorro || LINEAR || — || align=right | 7.9 km || 
|-id=303 bgcolor=#fefefe
| 66303 ||  || — || May 10, 1999 || Socorro || LINEAR || FLO || align=right | 1.6 km || 
|-id=304 bgcolor=#fefefe
| 66304 ||  || — || May 10, 1999 || Socorro || LINEAR || FLO || align=right | 2.0 km || 
|-id=305 bgcolor=#fefefe
| 66305 ||  || — || May 10, 1999 || Socorro || LINEAR || — || align=right | 4.0 km || 
|-id=306 bgcolor=#fefefe
| 66306 ||  || — || May 10, 1999 || Socorro || LINEAR || — || align=right | 2.3 km || 
|-id=307 bgcolor=#fefefe
| 66307 ||  || — || May 10, 1999 || Socorro || LINEAR || — || align=right | 3.6 km || 
|-id=308 bgcolor=#fefefe
| 66308 ||  || — || May 10, 1999 || Socorro || LINEAR || — || align=right | 2.9 km || 
|-id=309 bgcolor=#fefefe
| 66309 ||  || — || May 10, 1999 || Socorro || LINEAR || ERI || align=right | 3.4 km || 
|-id=310 bgcolor=#fefefe
| 66310 ||  || — || May 10, 1999 || Socorro || LINEAR || NYS || align=right | 1.9 km || 
|-id=311 bgcolor=#E9E9E9
| 66311 ||  || — || May 10, 1999 || Socorro || LINEAR || — || align=right | 2.0 km || 
|-id=312 bgcolor=#fefefe
| 66312 ||  || — || May 10, 1999 || Socorro || LINEAR || — || align=right | 3.0 km || 
|-id=313 bgcolor=#fefefe
| 66313 ||  || — || May 10, 1999 || Socorro || LINEAR || V || align=right | 2.5 km || 
|-id=314 bgcolor=#fefefe
| 66314 ||  || — || May 10, 1999 || Socorro || LINEAR || NYS || align=right | 4.2 km || 
|-id=315 bgcolor=#E9E9E9
| 66315 ||  || — || May 10, 1999 || Socorro || LINEAR || — || align=right | 2.6 km || 
|-id=316 bgcolor=#d6d6d6
| 66316 ||  || — || May 10, 1999 || Socorro || LINEAR || — || align=right | 7.7 km || 
|-id=317 bgcolor=#fefefe
| 66317 ||  || — || May 10, 1999 || Socorro || LINEAR || — || align=right | 2.2 km || 
|-id=318 bgcolor=#fefefe
| 66318 ||  || — || May 10, 1999 || Socorro || LINEAR || — || align=right | 2.8 km || 
|-id=319 bgcolor=#fefefe
| 66319 ||  || — || May 10, 1999 || Socorro || LINEAR || V || align=right | 2.2 km || 
|-id=320 bgcolor=#fefefe
| 66320 ||  || — || May 10, 1999 || Socorro || LINEAR || — || align=right | 1.8 km || 
|-id=321 bgcolor=#fefefe
| 66321 ||  || — || May 10, 1999 || Socorro || LINEAR || NYS || align=right | 1.7 km || 
|-id=322 bgcolor=#fefefe
| 66322 ||  || — || May 10, 1999 || Socorro || LINEAR || — || align=right | 2.0 km || 
|-id=323 bgcolor=#fefefe
| 66323 ||  || — || May 10, 1999 || Socorro || LINEAR || — || align=right | 3.6 km || 
|-id=324 bgcolor=#fefefe
| 66324 ||  || — || May 10, 1999 || Socorro || LINEAR || FLO || align=right | 1.9 km || 
|-id=325 bgcolor=#fefefe
| 66325 ||  || — || May 10, 1999 || Socorro || LINEAR || ERI || align=right | 5.1 km || 
|-id=326 bgcolor=#fefefe
| 66326 ||  || — || May 10, 1999 || Socorro || LINEAR || — || align=right | 2.2 km || 
|-id=327 bgcolor=#fefefe
| 66327 ||  || — || May 10, 1999 || Socorro || LINEAR || — || align=right | 1.4 km || 
|-id=328 bgcolor=#fefefe
| 66328 ||  || — || May 10, 1999 || Socorro || LINEAR || FLO || align=right | 2.0 km || 
|-id=329 bgcolor=#fefefe
| 66329 ||  || — || May 10, 1999 || Socorro || LINEAR || — || align=right | 2.4 km || 
|-id=330 bgcolor=#E9E9E9
| 66330 ||  || — || May 10, 1999 || Socorro || LINEAR || — || align=right | 2.3 km || 
|-id=331 bgcolor=#fefefe
| 66331 ||  || — || May 10, 1999 || Socorro || LINEAR || NYS || align=right | 2.6 km || 
|-id=332 bgcolor=#fefefe
| 66332 ||  || — || May 10, 1999 || Socorro || LINEAR || FLO || align=right | 1.9 km || 
|-id=333 bgcolor=#fefefe
| 66333 ||  || — || May 10, 1999 || Socorro || LINEAR || NYS || align=right | 4.7 km || 
|-id=334 bgcolor=#fefefe
| 66334 ||  || — || May 10, 1999 || Socorro || LINEAR || V || align=right | 2.3 km || 
|-id=335 bgcolor=#fefefe
| 66335 ||  || — || May 10, 1999 || Socorro || LINEAR || — || align=right | 3.4 km || 
|-id=336 bgcolor=#fefefe
| 66336 ||  || — || May 10, 1999 || Socorro || LINEAR || — || align=right | 5.8 km || 
|-id=337 bgcolor=#fefefe
| 66337 ||  || — || May 10, 1999 || Socorro || LINEAR || — || align=right | 2.2 km || 
|-id=338 bgcolor=#fefefe
| 66338 ||  || — || May 10, 1999 || Socorro || LINEAR || — || align=right | 1.8 km || 
|-id=339 bgcolor=#fefefe
| 66339 ||  || — || May 10, 1999 || Socorro || LINEAR || — || align=right | 2.8 km || 
|-id=340 bgcolor=#fefefe
| 66340 ||  || — || May 12, 1999 || Socorro || LINEAR || — || align=right | 2.7 km || 
|-id=341 bgcolor=#fefefe
| 66341 ||  || — || May 12, 1999 || Socorro || LINEAR || FLO || align=right | 2.6 km || 
|-id=342 bgcolor=#fefefe
| 66342 ||  || — || May 12, 1999 || Socorro || LINEAR || — || align=right | 2.4 km || 
|-id=343 bgcolor=#fefefe
| 66343 ||  || — || May 12, 1999 || Socorro || LINEAR || NYS || align=right | 2.3 km || 
|-id=344 bgcolor=#fefefe
| 66344 ||  || — || May 12, 1999 || Socorro || LINEAR || V || align=right | 2.0 km || 
|-id=345 bgcolor=#fefefe
| 66345 ||  || — || May 12, 1999 || Socorro || LINEAR || FLO || align=right | 1.5 km || 
|-id=346 bgcolor=#fefefe
| 66346 ||  || — || May 12, 1999 || Socorro || LINEAR || — || align=right | 2.4 km || 
|-id=347 bgcolor=#fefefe
| 66347 ||  || — || May 12, 1999 || Socorro || LINEAR || V || align=right | 1.9 km || 
|-id=348 bgcolor=#fefefe
| 66348 ||  || — || May 12, 1999 || Socorro || LINEAR || — || align=right | 2.8 km || 
|-id=349 bgcolor=#fefefe
| 66349 ||  || — || May 13, 1999 || Socorro || LINEAR || — || align=right | 2.1 km || 
|-id=350 bgcolor=#fefefe
| 66350 ||  || — || May 10, 1999 || Socorro || LINEAR || — || align=right | 3.0 km || 
|-id=351 bgcolor=#fefefe
| 66351 ||  || — || May 12, 1999 || Socorro || LINEAR || V || align=right | 1.8 km || 
|-id=352 bgcolor=#fefefe
| 66352 ||  || — || May 13, 1999 || Socorro || LINEAR || — || align=right | 2.1 km || 
|-id=353 bgcolor=#fefefe
| 66353 ||  || — || May 13, 1999 || Socorro || LINEAR || NYS || align=right | 2.7 km || 
|-id=354 bgcolor=#fefefe
| 66354 ||  || — || May 12, 1999 || Socorro || LINEAR || — || align=right | 3.6 km || 
|-id=355 bgcolor=#fefefe
| 66355 ||  || — || May 15, 1999 || Socorro || LINEAR || — || align=right | 2.2 km || 
|-id=356 bgcolor=#fefefe
| 66356 ||  || — || May 12, 1999 || Socorro || LINEAR || ERI || align=right | 4.6 km || 
|-id=357 bgcolor=#fefefe
| 66357 ||  || — || May 12, 1999 || Socorro || LINEAR || — || align=right | 1.7 km || 
|-id=358 bgcolor=#FA8072
| 66358 ||  || — || May 12, 1999 || Socorro || LINEAR || — || align=right | 2.2 km || 
|-id=359 bgcolor=#fefefe
| 66359 ||  || — || May 12, 1999 || Socorro || LINEAR || — || align=right | 1.7 km || 
|-id=360 bgcolor=#d6d6d6
| 66360 ||  || — || May 12, 1999 || Socorro || LINEAR || EUP || align=right | 8.6 km || 
|-id=361 bgcolor=#fefefe
| 66361 ||  || — || May 12, 1999 || Socorro || LINEAR || — || align=right | 2.4 km || 
|-id=362 bgcolor=#fefefe
| 66362 ||  || — || May 12, 1999 || Socorro || LINEAR || — || align=right | 3.4 km || 
|-id=363 bgcolor=#fefefe
| 66363 ||  || — || May 12, 1999 || Socorro || LINEAR || — || align=right | 2.0 km || 
|-id=364 bgcolor=#E9E9E9
| 66364 ||  || — || May 12, 1999 || Socorro || LINEAR || HNS || align=right | 2.9 km || 
|-id=365 bgcolor=#fefefe
| 66365 ||  || — || May 12, 1999 || Socorro || LINEAR || — || align=right | 1.6 km || 
|-id=366 bgcolor=#fefefe
| 66366 ||  || — || May 12, 1999 || Socorro || LINEAR || V || align=right | 1.4 km || 
|-id=367 bgcolor=#fefefe
| 66367 ||  || — || May 12, 1999 || Socorro || LINEAR || CHL || align=right | 3.8 km || 
|-id=368 bgcolor=#fefefe
| 66368 ||  || — || May 12, 1999 || Socorro || LINEAR || — || align=right | 4.2 km || 
|-id=369 bgcolor=#fefefe
| 66369 ||  || — || May 13, 1999 || Socorro || LINEAR || V || align=right | 1.4 km || 
|-id=370 bgcolor=#fefefe
| 66370 ||  || — || May 13, 1999 || Socorro || LINEAR || NYS || align=right | 4.2 km || 
|-id=371 bgcolor=#fefefe
| 66371 ||  || — || May 13, 1999 || Socorro || LINEAR || NYS || align=right | 1.6 km || 
|-id=372 bgcolor=#fefefe
| 66372 ||  || — || May 13, 1999 || Socorro || LINEAR || — || align=right | 2.0 km || 
|-id=373 bgcolor=#fefefe
| 66373 ||  || — || May 13, 1999 || Socorro || LINEAR || V || align=right | 2.2 km || 
|-id=374 bgcolor=#fefefe
| 66374 ||  || — || May 13, 1999 || Socorro || LINEAR || — || align=right | 1.8 km || 
|-id=375 bgcolor=#fefefe
| 66375 ||  || — || May 13, 1999 || Socorro || LINEAR || — || align=right | 2.7 km || 
|-id=376 bgcolor=#fefefe
| 66376 ||  || — || May 13, 1999 || Socorro || LINEAR || — || align=right | 3.0 km || 
|-id=377 bgcolor=#fefefe
| 66377 ||  || — || May 13, 1999 || Socorro || LINEAR || FLO || align=right | 1.8 km || 
|-id=378 bgcolor=#fefefe
| 66378 ||  || — || May 13, 1999 || Socorro || LINEAR || — || align=right | 2.7 km || 
|-id=379 bgcolor=#fefefe
| 66379 ||  || — || May 14, 1999 || Socorro || LINEAR || — || align=right | 4.1 km || 
|-id=380 bgcolor=#fefefe
| 66380 ||  || — || May 10, 1999 || Socorro || LINEAR || V || align=right | 1.3 km || 
|-id=381 bgcolor=#fefefe
| 66381 ||  || — || May 13, 1999 || Socorro || LINEAR || — || align=right | 1.6 km || 
|-id=382 bgcolor=#fefefe
| 66382 ||  || — || May 13, 1999 || Socorro || LINEAR || — || align=right | 1.5 km || 
|-id=383 bgcolor=#fefefe
| 66383 ||  || — || May 13, 1999 || Socorro || LINEAR || — || align=right | 1.4 km || 
|-id=384 bgcolor=#fefefe
| 66384 ||  || — || May 13, 1999 || Socorro || LINEAR || NYS || align=right | 2.8 km || 
|-id=385 bgcolor=#fefefe
| 66385 ||  || — || May 13, 1999 || Socorro || LINEAR || NYS || align=right | 1.3 km || 
|-id=386 bgcolor=#fefefe
| 66386 ||  || — || May 15, 1999 || Catalina || CSS || FLO || align=right | 1.4 km || 
|-id=387 bgcolor=#fefefe
| 66387 ||  || — || May 7, 1999 || Anderson Mesa || LONEOS || — || align=right | 1.4 km || 
|-id=388 bgcolor=#E9E9E9
| 66388 ||  || — || May 18, 1999 || Socorro || LINEAR || — || align=right | 2.4 km || 
|-id=389 bgcolor=#d6d6d6
| 66389 ||  || — || May 16, 1999 || Kitt Peak || Spacewatch || — || align=right | 4.5 km || 
|-id=390 bgcolor=#d6d6d6
| 66390 ||  || — || May 17, 1999 || Kitt Peak || Spacewatch || VER || align=right | 9.3 km || 
|-id=391 bgcolor=#FFC2E0
| 66391 Moshup ||  ||  || May 20, 1999 || Socorro || LINEAR || ATE +1kmPHAmoon || align=right | 1.3 km || 
|-id=392 bgcolor=#E9E9E9
| 66392 ||  || — || May 18, 1999 || Socorro || LINEAR || — || align=right | 2.2 km || 
|-id=393 bgcolor=#fefefe
| 66393 ||  || — || May 18, 1999 || Socorro || LINEAR || V || align=right | 1.6 km || 
|-id=394 bgcolor=#fefefe
| 66394 ||  || — || May 18, 1999 || Socorro || LINEAR || NYS || align=right | 1.3 km || 
|-id=395 bgcolor=#fefefe
| 66395 ||  || — || May 18, 1999 || Socorro || LINEAR || NYS || align=right | 1.7 km || 
|-id=396 bgcolor=#fefefe
| 66396 ||  || — || May 18, 1999 || Socorro || LINEAR || V || align=right | 2.5 km || 
|-id=397 bgcolor=#fefefe
| 66397 ||  || — || May 18, 1999 || Socorro || LINEAR || — || align=right | 1.5 km || 
|-id=398 bgcolor=#fefefe
| 66398 ||  || — || May 18, 1999 || Socorro || LINEAR || — || align=right | 3.1 km || 
|-id=399 bgcolor=#fefefe
| 66399 || 1999 LH || — || June 5, 1999 || Baton Rouge || W. R. Cooney Jr., M. Hess || NYS || align=right | 1.2 km || 
|-id=400 bgcolor=#FFC2E0
| 66400 ||  || — || June 9, 1999 || Socorro || LINEAR || ATE || align=right data-sort-value="0.41" | 410 m || 
|}

66401–66500 

|-bgcolor=#fefefe
| 66401 ||  || — || June 8, 1999 || Socorro || LINEAR || — || align=right | 3.0 km || 
|-id=402 bgcolor=#fefefe
| 66402 ||  || — || June 9, 1999 || Socorro || LINEAR || FLO || align=right | 2.4 km || 
|-id=403 bgcolor=#fefefe
| 66403 ||  || — || June 9, 1999 || Socorro || LINEAR || ERI || align=right | 4.1 km || 
|-id=404 bgcolor=#fefefe
| 66404 ||  || — || June 9, 1999 || Socorro || LINEAR || NYS || align=right | 1.3 km || 
|-id=405 bgcolor=#fefefe
| 66405 ||  || — || June 9, 1999 || Socorro || LINEAR || FLO || align=right | 1.8 km || 
|-id=406 bgcolor=#fefefe
| 66406 ||  || — || June 9, 1999 || Socorro || LINEAR || FLO || align=right | 2.3 km || 
|-id=407 bgcolor=#FFC2E0
| 66407 ||  || — || June 14, 1999 || Socorro || LINEAR || AMO || align=right data-sort-value="0.57" | 570 m || 
|-id=408 bgcolor=#fefefe
| 66408 ||  || — || June 14, 1999 || Socorro || LINEAR || NYS || align=right | 2.8 km || 
|-id=409 bgcolor=#E9E9E9
| 66409 ||  || — || June 20, 1999 || Anderson Mesa || LONEOS || MAR || align=right | 3.7 km || 
|-id=410 bgcolor=#fefefe
| 66410 ||  || — || July 13, 1999 || Socorro || LINEAR || — || align=right | 1.8 km || 
|-id=411 bgcolor=#E9E9E9
| 66411 ||  || — || July 13, 1999 || Socorro || LINEAR || EUN || align=right | 4.3 km || 
|-id=412 bgcolor=#fefefe
| 66412 ||  || — || July 13, 1999 || Socorro || LINEAR || — || align=right | 2.6 km || 
|-id=413 bgcolor=#E9E9E9
| 66413 ||  || — || July 13, 1999 || Socorro || LINEAR || EUN || align=right | 2.9 km || 
|-id=414 bgcolor=#E9E9E9
| 66414 ||  || — || July 13, 1999 || Socorro || LINEAR || — || align=right | 4.7 km || 
|-id=415 bgcolor=#fefefe
| 66415 ||  || — || July 13, 1999 || Socorro || LINEAR || MAS || align=right | 2.0 km || 
|-id=416 bgcolor=#E9E9E9
| 66416 ||  || — || July 13, 1999 || Socorro || LINEAR || — || align=right | 4.9 km || 
|-id=417 bgcolor=#fefefe
| 66417 ||  || — || July 13, 1999 || Socorro || LINEAR || V || align=right | 1.6 km || 
|-id=418 bgcolor=#E9E9E9
| 66418 ||  || — || July 13, 1999 || Socorro || LINEAR || MIT || align=right | 6.6 km || 
|-id=419 bgcolor=#FA8072
| 66419 ||  || — || July 14, 1999 || Socorro || LINEAR || — || align=right | 4.2 km || 
|-id=420 bgcolor=#fefefe
| 66420 ||  || — || July 14, 1999 || Socorro || LINEAR || — || align=right | 1.5 km || 
|-id=421 bgcolor=#fefefe
| 66421 ||  || — || July 14, 1999 || Socorro || LINEAR || SUL || align=right | 5.4 km || 
|-id=422 bgcolor=#fefefe
| 66422 ||  || — || July 14, 1999 || Socorro || LINEAR || MAS || align=right | 1.9 km || 
|-id=423 bgcolor=#fefefe
| 66423 ||  || — || July 14, 1999 || Socorro || LINEAR || ERI || align=right | 3.6 km || 
|-id=424 bgcolor=#fefefe
| 66424 ||  || — || July 14, 1999 || Socorro || LINEAR || — || align=right | 2.3 km || 
|-id=425 bgcolor=#fefefe
| 66425 ||  || — || July 14, 1999 || Socorro || LINEAR || — || align=right | 2.2 km || 
|-id=426 bgcolor=#fefefe
| 66426 ||  || — || July 14, 1999 || Socorro || LINEAR || — || align=right | 2.6 km || 
|-id=427 bgcolor=#fefefe
| 66427 ||  || — || July 14, 1999 || Socorro || LINEAR || — || align=right | 1.8 km || 
|-id=428 bgcolor=#fefefe
| 66428 ||  || — || July 14, 1999 || Socorro || LINEAR || MAS || align=right | 1.8 km || 
|-id=429 bgcolor=#E9E9E9
| 66429 ||  || — || July 14, 1999 || Socorro || LINEAR || — || align=right | 2.5 km || 
|-id=430 bgcolor=#fefefe
| 66430 ||  || — || July 14, 1999 || Socorro || LINEAR || — || align=right | 2.8 km || 
|-id=431 bgcolor=#fefefe
| 66431 ||  || — || July 13, 1999 || Socorro || LINEAR || — || align=right | 1.8 km || 
|-id=432 bgcolor=#fefefe
| 66432 ||  || — || July 13, 1999 || Socorro || LINEAR || CHL || align=right | 6.8 km || 
|-id=433 bgcolor=#fefefe
| 66433 ||  || — || July 13, 1999 || Socorro || LINEAR || PHO || align=right | 3.2 km || 
|-id=434 bgcolor=#fefefe
| 66434 ||  || — || July 13, 1999 || Socorro || LINEAR || — || align=right | 2.1 km || 
|-id=435 bgcolor=#fefefe
| 66435 ||  || — || July 14, 1999 || Socorro || LINEAR || NYS || align=right | 2.1 km || 
|-id=436 bgcolor=#E9E9E9
| 66436 ||  || — || July 12, 1999 || Socorro || LINEAR || — || align=right | 3.0 km || 
|-id=437 bgcolor=#E9E9E9
| 66437 ||  || — || July 12, 1999 || Socorro || LINEAR || — || align=right | 4.1 km || 
|-id=438 bgcolor=#E9E9E9
| 66438 ||  || — || July 12, 1999 || Socorro || LINEAR || — || align=right | 4.0 km || 
|-id=439 bgcolor=#E9E9E9
| 66439 ||  || — || July 12, 1999 || Socorro || LINEAR || MAR || align=right | 4.4 km || 
|-id=440 bgcolor=#E9E9E9
| 66440 ||  || — || July 12, 1999 || Socorro || LINEAR || — || align=right | 4.5 km || 
|-id=441 bgcolor=#E9E9E9
| 66441 ||  || — || July 12, 1999 || Socorro || LINEAR || — || align=right | 3.2 km || 
|-id=442 bgcolor=#E9E9E9
| 66442 ||  || — || July 12, 1999 || Socorro || LINEAR || — || align=right | 4.9 km || 
|-id=443 bgcolor=#E9E9E9
| 66443 ||  || — || July 13, 1999 || Socorro || LINEAR || — || align=right | 2.6 km || 
|-id=444 bgcolor=#E9E9E9
| 66444 ||  || — || July 13, 1999 || Socorro || LINEAR || — || align=right | 7.6 km || 
|-id=445 bgcolor=#E9E9E9
| 66445 ||  || — || July 13, 1999 || Socorro || LINEAR || — || align=right | 4.8 km || 
|-id=446 bgcolor=#E9E9E9
| 66446 ||  || — || July 13, 1999 || Socorro || LINEAR || EUN || align=right | 3.5 km || 
|-id=447 bgcolor=#fefefe
| 66447 ||  || — || July 13, 1999 || Socorro || LINEAR || V || align=right | 1.8 km || 
|-id=448 bgcolor=#E9E9E9
| 66448 ||  || — || July 22, 1999 || Socorro || LINEAR || MAR || align=right | 4.9 km || 
|-id=449 bgcolor=#E9E9E9
| 66449 ||  || — || July 22, 1999 || Socorro || LINEAR || — || align=right | 3.9 km || 
|-id=450 bgcolor=#E9E9E9
| 66450 ||  || — || July 22, 1999 || Socorro || LINEAR || — || align=right | 3.6 km || 
|-id=451 bgcolor=#E9E9E9
| 66451 ||  || — || July 22, 1999 || Socorro || LINEAR || EUN || align=right | 3.8 km || 
|-id=452 bgcolor=#C2E0FF
| 66452 ||  || — || July 21, 1999 || Mauna Kea || Mauna Kea Obs. || cubewano (cold)critical || align=right | 185 km || 
|-id=453 bgcolor=#E9E9E9
| 66453 || 1999 PC || — || August 3, 1999 || Prescott || P. G. Comba || — || align=right | 5.9 km || 
|-id=454 bgcolor=#E9E9E9
| 66454 Terezabeatriz || 1999 PM ||  || August 3, 1999 || Wykrota || C. Jacques, L. Duczmal || — || align=right | 2.0 km || 
|-id=455 bgcolor=#E9E9E9
| 66455 ||  || — || August 7, 1999 || Kitt Peak || Spacewatch || — || align=right | 5.2 km || 
|-id=456 bgcolor=#E9E9E9
| 66456 ||  || — || August 12, 1999 || Kitt Peak || Spacewatch || — || align=right | 3.4 km || 
|-id=457 bgcolor=#E9E9E9
| 66457 ||  || — || August 7, 1999 || Anderson Mesa || LONEOS || — || align=right | 1.7 km || 
|-id=458 bgcolor=#E9E9E9
| 66458 Romaplanetario ||  ||  || August 22, 1999 || Ceccano || G. Masi || — || align=right | 2.8 km || 
|-id=459 bgcolor=#E9E9E9
| 66459 ||  || — || September 4, 1999 || Catalina || CSS || GEF || align=right | 2.9 km || 
|-id=460 bgcolor=#E9E9E9
| 66460 ||  || — || September 4, 1999 || Kitt Peak || Spacewatch || — || align=right | 4.4 km || 
|-id=461 bgcolor=#E9E9E9
| 66461 ||  || — || September 7, 1999 || Socorro || LINEAR || — || align=right | 2.5 km || 
|-id=462 bgcolor=#fefefe
| 66462 ||  || — || September 7, 1999 || Socorro || LINEAR || V || align=right | 3.2 km || 
|-id=463 bgcolor=#fefefe
| 66463 ||  || — || September 7, 1999 || Socorro || LINEAR || V || align=right | 3.2 km || 
|-id=464 bgcolor=#E9E9E9
| 66464 ||  || — || September 7, 1999 || Socorro || LINEAR || — || align=right | 2.5 km || 
|-id=465 bgcolor=#E9E9E9
| 66465 ||  || — || September 7, 1999 || Socorro || LINEAR || — || align=right | 3.8 km || 
|-id=466 bgcolor=#E9E9E9
| 66466 ||  || — || September 7, 1999 || Socorro || LINEAR || — || align=right | 2.6 km || 
|-id=467 bgcolor=#fefefe
| 66467 ||  || — || September 7, 1999 || Socorro || LINEAR || — || align=right | 2.3 km || 
|-id=468 bgcolor=#E9E9E9
| 66468 ||  || — || September 7, 1999 || Socorro || LINEAR || — || align=right | 3.7 km || 
|-id=469 bgcolor=#E9E9E9
| 66469 ||  || — || September 7, 1999 || Socorro || LINEAR || MAR || align=right | 3.4 km || 
|-id=470 bgcolor=#E9E9E9
| 66470 ||  || — || September 7, 1999 || Socorro || LINEAR || JUN || align=right | 2.3 km || 
|-id=471 bgcolor=#E9E9E9
| 66471 ||  || — || September 7, 1999 || Socorro || LINEAR || — || align=right | 4.6 km || 
|-id=472 bgcolor=#E9E9E9
| 66472 ||  || — || September 7, 1999 || Socorro || LINEAR || — || align=right | 3.4 km || 
|-id=473 bgcolor=#E9E9E9
| 66473 ||  || — || September 7, 1999 || Socorro || LINEAR || — || align=right | 6.3 km || 
|-id=474 bgcolor=#E9E9E9
| 66474 ||  || — || September 7, 1999 || Socorro || LINEAR || EUN || align=right | 2.9 km || 
|-id=475 bgcolor=#E9E9E9
| 66475 ||  || — || September 7, 1999 || Socorro || LINEAR || MAR || align=right | 3.8 km || 
|-id=476 bgcolor=#E9E9E9
| 66476 ||  || — || September 7, 1999 || Socorro || LINEAR || — || align=right | 3.2 km || 
|-id=477 bgcolor=#E9E9E9
| 66477 ||  || — || September 7, 1999 || Socorro || LINEAR || — || align=right | 2.6 km || 
|-id=478 bgcolor=#E9E9E9
| 66478 ||  || — || September 7, 1999 || Socorro || LINEAR || — || align=right | 3.1 km || 
|-id=479 bgcolor=#E9E9E9
| 66479 Healy ||  ||  || September 4, 1999 || OCA-Anza || M. Collins, M. White || — || align=right | 5.6 km || 
|-id=480 bgcolor=#E9E9E9
| 66480 ||  || — || September 10, 1999 || Starkenburg Observatory || Starkenburg Obs. || ADE || align=right | 5.5 km || 
|-id=481 bgcolor=#fefefe
| 66481 ||  || — || September 11, 1999 || Višnjan Observatory || K. Korlević || — || align=right | 5.2 km || 
|-id=482 bgcolor=#E9E9E9
| 66482 ||  || — || September 12, 1999 || Višnjan Observatory || K. Korlević || EUN || align=right | 3.4 km || 
|-id=483 bgcolor=#E9E9E9
| 66483 ||  || — || September 13, 1999 || Reedy Creek || J. Broughton || — || align=right | 3.8 km || 
|-id=484 bgcolor=#fefefe
| 66484 ||  || — || September 7, 1999 || Catalina || CSS || — || align=right | 2.4 km || 
|-id=485 bgcolor=#E9E9E9
| 66485 ||  || — || September 13, 1999 || Višnjan Observatory || K. Korlević || MAR || align=right | 4.7 km || 
|-id=486 bgcolor=#E9E9E9
| 66486 ||  || — || September 14, 1999 || Ondřejov || P. Kušnirák, P. Pravec || — || align=right | 4.0 km || 
|-id=487 bgcolor=#E9E9E9
| 66487 ||  || — || September 13, 1999 || Višnjan Observatory || K. Korlević || HNA || align=right | 8.1 km || 
|-id=488 bgcolor=#E9E9E9
| 66488 ||  || — || September 15, 1999 || Calgary || G. W. Billings || MAR || align=right | 3.6 km || 
|-id=489 bgcolor=#E9E9E9
| 66489 ||  || — || September 15, 1999 || Višnjan Observatory || K. Korlević || — || align=right | 2.6 km || 
|-id=490 bgcolor=#fefefe
| 66490 ||  || — || September 7, 1999 || Socorro || LINEAR || — || align=right | 2.5 km || 
|-id=491 bgcolor=#fefefe
| 66491 ||  || — || September 7, 1999 || Socorro || LINEAR || — || align=right | 2.2 km || 
|-id=492 bgcolor=#d6d6d6
| 66492 ||  || — || September 7, 1999 || Socorro || LINEAR || — || align=right | 6.3 km || 
|-id=493 bgcolor=#E9E9E9
| 66493 ||  || — || September 7, 1999 || Socorro || LINEAR || — || align=right | 2.2 km || 
|-id=494 bgcolor=#E9E9E9
| 66494 ||  || — || September 7, 1999 || Socorro || LINEAR || GEF || align=right | 2.8 km || 
|-id=495 bgcolor=#fefefe
| 66495 ||  || — || September 7, 1999 || Socorro || LINEAR || — || align=right | 2.4 km || 
|-id=496 bgcolor=#fefefe
| 66496 ||  || — || September 7, 1999 || Socorro || LINEAR || — || align=right | 2.3 km || 
|-id=497 bgcolor=#E9E9E9
| 66497 ||  || — || September 7, 1999 || Socorro || LINEAR || — || align=right | 2.3 km || 
|-id=498 bgcolor=#E9E9E9
| 66498 ||  || — || September 7, 1999 || Socorro || LINEAR || — || align=right | 3.0 km || 
|-id=499 bgcolor=#fefefe
| 66499 ||  || — || September 7, 1999 || Socorro || LINEAR || — || align=right | 2.1 km || 
|-id=500 bgcolor=#E9E9E9
| 66500 ||  || — || September 7, 1999 || Socorro || LINEAR || — || align=right | 2.1 km || 
|}

66501–66600 

|-bgcolor=#E9E9E9
| 66501 ||  || — || September 7, 1999 || Socorro || LINEAR || — || align=right | 2.7 km || 
|-id=502 bgcolor=#E9E9E9
| 66502 ||  || — || September 7, 1999 || Socorro || LINEAR || — || align=right | 3.6 km || 
|-id=503 bgcolor=#E9E9E9
| 66503 ||  || — || September 7, 1999 || Socorro || LINEAR || — || align=right | 2.2 km || 
|-id=504 bgcolor=#E9E9E9
| 66504 ||  || — || September 7, 1999 || Socorro || LINEAR || — || align=right | 2.2 km || 
|-id=505 bgcolor=#E9E9E9
| 66505 ||  || — || September 7, 1999 || Socorro || LINEAR || — || align=right | 2.5 km || 
|-id=506 bgcolor=#E9E9E9
| 66506 ||  || — || September 7, 1999 || Socorro || LINEAR || — || align=right | 2.7 km || 
|-id=507 bgcolor=#E9E9E9
| 66507 ||  || — || September 7, 1999 || Socorro || LINEAR || — || align=right | 3.6 km || 
|-id=508 bgcolor=#E9E9E9
| 66508 ||  || — || September 7, 1999 || Socorro || LINEAR || — || align=right | 2.7 km || 
|-id=509 bgcolor=#fefefe
| 66509 ||  || — || September 7, 1999 || Socorro || LINEAR || — || align=right | 3.0 km || 
|-id=510 bgcolor=#E9E9E9
| 66510 ||  || — || September 7, 1999 || Socorro || LINEAR || — || align=right | 5.4 km || 
|-id=511 bgcolor=#E9E9E9
| 66511 ||  || — || September 7, 1999 || Socorro || LINEAR || — || align=right | 1.7 km || 
|-id=512 bgcolor=#E9E9E9
| 66512 ||  || — || September 7, 1999 || Socorro || LINEAR || — || align=right | 2.7 km || 
|-id=513 bgcolor=#E9E9E9
| 66513 ||  || — || September 7, 1999 || Socorro || LINEAR || — || align=right | 2.8 km || 
|-id=514 bgcolor=#d6d6d6
| 66514 ||  || — || September 7, 1999 || Socorro || LINEAR || — || align=right | 7.1 km || 
|-id=515 bgcolor=#E9E9E9
| 66515 ||  || — || September 7, 1999 || Socorro || LINEAR || — || align=right | 1.7 km || 
|-id=516 bgcolor=#E9E9E9
| 66516 ||  || — || September 7, 1999 || Socorro || LINEAR || — || align=right | 1.9 km || 
|-id=517 bgcolor=#E9E9E9
| 66517 ||  || — || September 7, 1999 || Socorro || LINEAR || — || align=right | 2.7 km || 
|-id=518 bgcolor=#fefefe
| 66518 ||  || — || September 8, 1999 || Socorro || LINEAR || — || align=right | 1.8 km || 
|-id=519 bgcolor=#E9E9E9
| 66519 ||  || — || September 8, 1999 || Socorro || LINEAR || — || align=right | 4.3 km || 
|-id=520 bgcolor=#E9E9E9
| 66520 ||  || — || September 8, 1999 || Socorro || LINEAR || ADE || align=right | 5.9 km || 
|-id=521 bgcolor=#E9E9E9
| 66521 ||  || — || September 8, 1999 || Socorro || LINEAR || — || align=right | 4.8 km || 
|-id=522 bgcolor=#E9E9E9
| 66522 ||  || — || September 8, 1999 || Socorro || LINEAR || — || align=right | 6.0 km || 
|-id=523 bgcolor=#E9E9E9
| 66523 ||  || — || September 8, 1999 || Socorro || LINEAR || — || align=right | 4.6 km || 
|-id=524 bgcolor=#E9E9E9
| 66524 ||  || — || September 8, 1999 || Socorro || LINEAR || — || align=right | 3.5 km || 
|-id=525 bgcolor=#fefefe
| 66525 ||  || — || September 8, 1999 || Socorro || LINEAR || — || align=right | 2.7 km || 
|-id=526 bgcolor=#E9E9E9
| 66526 ||  || — || September 8, 1999 || Socorro || LINEAR || — || align=right | 2.7 km || 
|-id=527 bgcolor=#E9E9E9
| 66527 ||  || — || September 8, 1999 || Socorro || LINEAR || — || align=right | 4.0 km || 
|-id=528 bgcolor=#E9E9E9
| 66528 ||  || — || September 8, 1999 || Socorro || LINEAR || MAR || align=right | 3.6 km || 
|-id=529 bgcolor=#E9E9E9
| 66529 ||  || — || September 8, 1999 || Socorro || LINEAR || — || align=right | 5.3 km || 
|-id=530 bgcolor=#E9E9E9
| 66530 ||  || — || September 8, 1999 || Socorro || LINEAR || EUN || align=right | 3.2 km || 
|-id=531 bgcolor=#E9E9E9
| 66531 ||  || — || September 8, 1999 || Socorro || LINEAR || — || align=right | 4.5 km || 
|-id=532 bgcolor=#E9E9E9
| 66532 ||  || — || September 8, 1999 || Socorro || LINEAR || — || align=right | 4.1 km || 
|-id=533 bgcolor=#fefefe
| 66533 ||  || — || September 9, 1999 || Socorro || LINEAR || — || align=right | 2.6 km || 
|-id=534 bgcolor=#fefefe
| 66534 ||  || — || September 9, 1999 || Socorro || LINEAR || V || align=right | 1.9 km || 
|-id=535 bgcolor=#E9E9E9
| 66535 ||  || — || September 9, 1999 || Socorro || LINEAR || — || align=right | 4.1 km || 
|-id=536 bgcolor=#E9E9E9
| 66536 ||  || — || September 9, 1999 || Socorro || LINEAR || — || align=right | 2.9 km || 
|-id=537 bgcolor=#E9E9E9
| 66537 ||  || — || September 9, 1999 || Socorro || LINEAR || — || align=right | 2.4 km || 
|-id=538 bgcolor=#E9E9E9
| 66538 ||  || — || September 9, 1999 || Socorro || LINEAR || — || align=right | 3.1 km || 
|-id=539 bgcolor=#E9E9E9
| 66539 ||  || — || September 9, 1999 || Socorro || LINEAR || — || align=right | 2.9 km || 
|-id=540 bgcolor=#fefefe
| 66540 ||  || — || September 9, 1999 || Socorro || LINEAR || — || align=right | 2.5 km || 
|-id=541 bgcolor=#fefefe
| 66541 ||  || — || September 9, 1999 || Socorro || LINEAR || KLI || align=right | 5.5 km || 
|-id=542 bgcolor=#E9E9E9
| 66542 ||  || — || September 9, 1999 || Socorro || LINEAR || EUN || align=right | 3.3 km || 
|-id=543 bgcolor=#fefefe
| 66543 ||  || — || September 9, 1999 || Socorro || LINEAR || — || align=right | 2.2 km || 
|-id=544 bgcolor=#E9E9E9
| 66544 ||  || — || September 9, 1999 || Socorro || LINEAR || RAF || align=right | 1.8 km || 
|-id=545 bgcolor=#E9E9E9
| 66545 ||  || — || September 9, 1999 || Socorro || LINEAR || — || align=right | 2.3 km || 
|-id=546 bgcolor=#fefefe
| 66546 ||  || — || September 9, 1999 || Socorro || LINEAR || — || align=right | 3.8 km || 
|-id=547 bgcolor=#E9E9E9
| 66547 ||  || — || September 9, 1999 || Socorro || LINEAR || — || align=right | 6.5 km || 
|-id=548 bgcolor=#E9E9E9
| 66548 ||  || — || September 9, 1999 || Socorro || LINEAR || EUN || align=right | 4.5 km || 
|-id=549 bgcolor=#E9E9E9
| 66549 ||  || — || September 9, 1999 || Socorro || LINEAR || RAF || align=right | 2.2 km || 
|-id=550 bgcolor=#E9E9E9
| 66550 ||  || — || September 9, 1999 || Socorro || LINEAR || — || align=right | 2.4 km || 
|-id=551 bgcolor=#E9E9E9
| 66551 ||  || — || September 9, 1999 || Socorro || LINEAR || — || align=right | 3.9 km || 
|-id=552 bgcolor=#fefefe
| 66552 ||  || — || September 9, 1999 || Socorro || LINEAR || V || align=right | 2.6 km || 
|-id=553 bgcolor=#E9E9E9
| 66553 ||  || — || September 9, 1999 || Socorro || LINEAR || RAF || align=right | 2.6 km || 
|-id=554 bgcolor=#E9E9E9
| 66554 ||  || — || September 9, 1999 || Socorro || LINEAR || — || align=right | 4.6 km || 
|-id=555 bgcolor=#E9E9E9
| 66555 ||  || — || September 9, 1999 || Socorro || LINEAR || — || align=right | 3.2 km || 
|-id=556 bgcolor=#E9E9E9
| 66556 ||  || — || September 9, 1999 || Socorro || LINEAR || — || align=right | 3.7 km || 
|-id=557 bgcolor=#E9E9E9
| 66557 ||  || — || September 9, 1999 || Socorro || LINEAR || EUN || align=right | 3.1 km || 
|-id=558 bgcolor=#E9E9E9
| 66558 ||  || — || September 9, 1999 || Socorro || LINEAR || — || align=right | 2.9 km || 
|-id=559 bgcolor=#E9E9E9
| 66559 ||  || — || September 9, 1999 || Socorro || LINEAR || PAE || align=right | 6.7 km || 
|-id=560 bgcolor=#fefefe
| 66560 ||  || — || September 9, 1999 || Socorro || LINEAR || MAS || align=right | 3.3 km || 
|-id=561 bgcolor=#fefefe
| 66561 ||  || — || September 9, 1999 || Socorro || LINEAR || — || align=right | 2.5 km || 
|-id=562 bgcolor=#E9E9E9
| 66562 ||  || — || September 9, 1999 || Socorro || LINEAR || fast? || align=right | 2.0 km || 
|-id=563 bgcolor=#fefefe
| 66563 ||  || — || September 9, 1999 || Socorro || LINEAR || — || align=right | 1.7 km || 
|-id=564 bgcolor=#fefefe
| 66564 ||  || — || September 9, 1999 || Socorro || LINEAR || — || align=right | 2.4 km || 
|-id=565 bgcolor=#E9E9E9
| 66565 ||  || — || September 9, 1999 || Socorro || LINEAR || — || align=right | 2.1 km || 
|-id=566 bgcolor=#fefefe
| 66566 ||  || — || September 9, 1999 || Socorro || LINEAR || — || align=right | 3.1 km || 
|-id=567 bgcolor=#E9E9E9
| 66567 ||  || — || September 9, 1999 || Socorro || LINEAR || — || align=right | 3.1 km || 
|-id=568 bgcolor=#E9E9E9
| 66568 ||  || — || September 9, 1999 || Socorro || LINEAR || — || align=right | 5.4 km || 
|-id=569 bgcolor=#E9E9E9
| 66569 ||  || — || September 9, 1999 || Socorro || LINEAR || EUN || align=right | 2.7 km || 
|-id=570 bgcolor=#E9E9E9
| 66570 ||  || — || September 9, 1999 || Socorro || LINEAR || — || align=right | 2.2 km || 
|-id=571 bgcolor=#fefefe
| 66571 ||  || — || September 9, 1999 || Socorro || LINEAR || V || align=right | 2.1 km || 
|-id=572 bgcolor=#fefefe
| 66572 ||  || — || September 9, 1999 || Socorro || LINEAR || — || align=right | 2.2 km || 
|-id=573 bgcolor=#E9E9E9
| 66573 ||  || — || September 14, 1999 || Socorro || LINEAR || — || align=right | 2.5 km || 
|-id=574 bgcolor=#E9E9E9
| 66574 ||  || — || September 9, 1999 || Socorro || LINEAR || — || align=right | 4.1 km || 
|-id=575 bgcolor=#E9E9E9
| 66575 ||  || — || September 9, 1999 || Socorro || LINEAR || PAE || align=right | 5.4 km || 
|-id=576 bgcolor=#fefefe
| 66576 ||  || — || September 9, 1999 || Socorro || LINEAR || — || align=right | 2.2 km || 
|-id=577 bgcolor=#E9E9E9
| 66577 ||  || — || September 9, 1999 || Socorro || LINEAR || EUN || align=right | 3.1 km || 
|-id=578 bgcolor=#E9E9E9
| 66578 ||  || — || September 9, 1999 || Socorro || LINEAR || — || align=right | 4.3 km || 
|-id=579 bgcolor=#E9E9E9
| 66579 ||  || — || September 9, 1999 || Socorro || LINEAR || — || align=right | 4.0 km || 
|-id=580 bgcolor=#E9E9E9
| 66580 ||  || — || September 9, 1999 || Socorro || LINEAR || — || align=right | 3.5 km || 
|-id=581 bgcolor=#E9E9E9
| 66581 ||  || — || September 9, 1999 || Socorro || LINEAR || — || align=right | 2.2 km || 
|-id=582 bgcolor=#E9E9E9
| 66582 ||  || — || September 9, 1999 || Socorro || LINEAR || — || align=right | 2.0 km || 
|-id=583 bgcolor=#E9E9E9
| 66583 Nicandra ||  ||  || September 9, 1999 || Socorro || LINEAR || — || align=right | 6.0 km || 
|-id=584 bgcolor=#E9E9E9
| 66584 ||  || — || September 9, 1999 || Socorro || LINEAR || MAR || align=right | 3.6 km || 
|-id=585 bgcolor=#E9E9E9
| 66585 ||  || — || September 9, 1999 || Socorro || LINEAR || — || align=right | 3.3 km || 
|-id=586 bgcolor=#E9E9E9
| 66586 ||  || — || September 9, 1999 || Socorro || LINEAR || — || align=right | 4.0 km || 
|-id=587 bgcolor=#fefefe
| 66587 ||  || — || September 9, 1999 || Socorro || LINEAR || — || align=right | 2.9 km || 
|-id=588 bgcolor=#E9E9E9
| 66588 ||  || — || September 9, 1999 || Socorro || LINEAR || — || align=right | 5.3 km || 
|-id=589 bgcolor=#fefefe
| 66589 ||  || — || September 9, 1999 || Socorro || LINEAR || NYS || align=right | 4.4 km || 
|-id=590 bgcolor=#E9E9E9
| 66590 ||  || — || September 9, 1999 || Socorro || LINEAR || — || align=right | 3.5 km || 
|-id=591 bgcolor=#d6d6d6
| 66591 ||  || — || September 9, 1999 || Socorro || LINEAR || EOS || align=right | 4.4 km || 
|-id=592 bgcolor=#E9E9E9
| 66592 ||  || — || September 9, 1999 || Socorro || LINEAR || — || align=right | 4.0 km || 
|-id=593 bgcolor=#fefefe
| 66593 ||  || — || September 9, 1999 || Socorro || LINEAR || FLO || align=right | 1.4 km || 
|-id=594 bgcolor=#E9E9E9
| 66594 ||  || — || September 9, 1999 || Socorro || LINEAR || EUN || align=right | 2.5 km || 
|-id=595 bgcolor=#E9E9E9
| 66595 ||  || — || September 9, 1999 || Socorro || LINEAR || — || align=right | 2.9 km || 
|-id=596 bgcolor=#E9E9E9
| 66596 ||  || — || September 9, 1999 || Socorro || LINEAR || — || align=right | 2.5 km || 
|-id=597 bgcolor=#E9E9E9
| 66597 ||  || — || September 9, 1999 || Socorro || LINEAR || — || align=right | 2.0 km || 
|-id=598 bgcolor=#fefefe
| 66598 ||  || — || September 9, 1999 || Socorro || LINEAR || — || align=right | 2.4 km || 
|-id=599 bgcolor=#E9E9E9
| 66599 ||  || — || September 9, 1999 || Socorro || LINEAR || EUN || align=right | 2.4 km || 
|-id=600 bgcolor=#E9E9E9
| 66600 ||  || — || September 9, 1999 || Socorro || LINEAR || — || align=right | 4.1 km || 
|}

66601–66700 

|-bgcolor=#E9E9E9
| 66601 ||  || — || September 9, 1999 || Socorro || LINEAR || MIT || align=right | 4.5 km || 
|-id=602 bgcolor=#E9E9E9
| 66602 ||  || — || September 9, 1999 || Socorro || LINEAR || — || align=right | 2.8 km || 
|-id=603 bgcolor=#E9E9E9
| 66603 ||  || — || September 9, 1999 || Socorro || LINEAR || — || align=right | 2.5 km || 
|-id=604 bgcolor=#E9E9E9
| 66604 ||  || — || September 7, 1999 || Socorro || LINEAR || — || align=right | 6.4 km || 
|-id=605 bgcolor=#fefefe
| 66605 ||  || — || September 7, 1999 || Socorro || LINEAR || — || align=right | 5.1 km || 
|-id=606 bgcolor=#E9E9E9
| 66606 ||  || — || September 7, 1999 || Socorro || LINEAR || — || align=right | 3.6 km || 
|-id=607 bgcolor=#E9E9E9
| 66607 ||  || — || September 8, 1999 || Socorro || LINEAR || EUN || align=right | 2.6 km || 
|-id=608 bgcolor=#fefefe
| 66608 ||  || — || September 8, 1999 || Socorro || LINEAR || — || align=right | 2.0 km || 
|-id=609 bgcolor=#E9E9E9
| 66609 ||  || — || September 10, 1999 || Socorro || LINEAR || — || align=right | 4.6 km || 
|-id=610 bgcolor=#E9E9E9
| 66610 ||  || — || September 10, 1999 || Socorro || LINEAR || EUN || align=right | 3.1 km || 
|-id=611 bgcolor=#E9E9E9
| 66611 ||  || — || September 10, 1999 || Socorro || LINEAR || — || align=right | 4.8 km || 
|-id=612 bgcolor=#E9E9E9
| 66612 ||  || — || September 8, 1999 || Socorro || LINEAR || — || align=right | 4.2 km || 
|-id=613 bgcolor=#E9E9E9
| 66613 ||  || — || September 8, 1999 || Socorro || LINEAR || — || align=right | 3.3 km || 
|-id=614 bgcolor=#E9E9E9
| 66614 ||  || — || September 8, 1999 || Socorro || LINEAR || — || align=right | 4.8 km || 
|-id=615 bgcolor=#E9E9E9
| 66615 ||  || — || September 8, 1999 || Socorro || LINEAR || — || align=right | 9.0 km || 
|-id=616 bgcolor=#E9E9E9
| 66616 ||  || — || September 8, 1999 || Socorro || LINEAR || — || align=right | 5.0 km || 
|-id=617 bgcolor=#E9E9E9
| 66617 ||  || — || September 8, 1999 || Socorro || LINEAR || — || align=right | 4.8 km || 
|-id=618 bgcolor=#E9E9E9
| 66618 ||  || — || September 8, 1999 || Socorro || LINEAR || — || align=right | 3.7 km || 
|-id=619 bgcolor=#E9E9E9
| 66619 ||  || — || September 8, 1999 || Socorro || LINEAR || — || align=right | 3.0 km || 
|-id=620 bgcolor=#E9E9E9
| 66620 ||  || — || September 8, 1999 || Socorro || LINEAR || — || align=right | 5.2 km || 
|-id=621 bgcolor=#E9E9E9
| 66621 ||  || — || September 8, 1999 || Socorro || LINEAR || EUN || align=right | 3.8 km || 
|-id=622 bgcolor=#E9E9E9
| 66622 ||  || — || September 8, 1999 || Socorro || LINEAR || GEF || align=right | 2.8 km || 
|-id=623 bgcolor=#E9E9E9
| 66623 ||  || — || September 8, 1999 || Socorro || LINEAR || EUN || align=right | 2.8 km || 
|-id=624 bgcolor=#E9E9E9
| 66624 ||  || — || September 8, 1999 || Socorro || LINEAR || — || align=right | 3.9 km || 
|-id=625 bgcolor=#E9E9E9
| 66625 ||  || — || September 8, 1999 || Socorro || LINEAR || — || align=right | 4.0 km || 
|-id=626 bgcolor=#E9E9E9
| 66626 ||  || — || September 8, 1999 || Socorro || LINEAR || — || align=right | 4.3 km || 
|-id=627 bgcolor=#E9E9E9
| 66627 ||  || — || September 8, 1999 || Socorro || LINEAR || MAR || align=right | 3.1 km || 
|-id=628 bgcolor=#E9E9E9
| 66628 ||  || — || September 8, 1999 || Socorro || LINEAR || GER || align=right | 3.2 km || 
|-id=629 bgcolor=#E9E9E9
| 66629 ||  || — || September 8, 1999 || Socorro || LINEAR || GEF || align=right | 4.1 km || 
|-id=630 bgcolor=#E9E9E9
| 66630 ||  || — || September 8, 1999 || Socorro || LINEAR || — || align=right | 3.2 km || 
|-id=631 bgcolor=#E9E9E9
| 66631 ||  || — || September 8, 1999 || Socorro || LINEAR || — || align=right | 3.1 km || 
|-id=632 bgcolor=#E9E9E9
| 66632 ||  || — || September 8, 1999 || Socorro || LINEAR || — || align=right | 4.8 km || 
|-id=633 bgcolor=#E9E9E9
| 66633 ||  || — || September 8, 1999 || Socorro || LINEAR || — || align=right | 8.4 km || 
|-id=634 bgcolor=#E9E9E9
| 66634 ||  || — || September 8, 1999 || Socorro || LINEAR || — || align=right | 4.0 km || 
|-id=635 bgcolor=#d6d6d6
| 66635 ||  || — || September 8, 1999 || Socorro || LINEAR || BRA || align=right | 5.0 km || 
|-id=636 bgcolor=#E9E9E9
| 66636 ||  || — || September 9, 1999 || Socorro || LINEAR || — || align=right | 3.3 km || 
|-id=637 bgcolor=#E9E9E9
| 66637 ||  || — || September 9, 1999 || Socorro || LINEAR || — || align=right | 5.7 km || 
|-id=638 bgcolor=#E9E9E9
| 66638 ||  || — || September 4, 1999 || Catalina || CSS || — || align=right | 4.4 km || 
|-id=639 bgcolor=#E9E9E9
| 66639 ||  || — || September 4, 1999 || Anderson Mesa || LONEOS || MIT || align=right | 5.1 km || 
|-id=640 bgcolor=#E9E9E9
| 66640 ||  || — || September 4, 1999 || Catalina || CSS || — || align=right | 1.8 km || 
|-id=641 bgcolor=#E9E9E9
| 66641 ||  || — || September 3, 1999 || Kitt Peak || Spacewatch || — || align=right | 3.4 km || 
|-id=642 bgcolor=#E9E9E9
| 66642 ||  || — || September 4, 1999 || Catalina || CSS || ADE || align=right | 5.2 km || 
|-id=643 bgcolor=#E9E9E9
| 66643 ||  || — || September 8, 1999 || Catalina || CSS || — || align=right | 6.6 km || 
|-id=644 bgcolor=#E9E9E9
| 66644 ||  || — || September 9, 1999 || Anderson Mesa || LONEOS || RAF || align=right | 6.2 km || 
|-id=645 bgcolor=#d6d6d6
| 66645 ||  || — || September 9, 1999 || Anderson Mesa || LONEOS || — || align=right | 7.0 km || 
|-id=646 bgcolor=#E9E9E9
| 66646 ||  || — || September 8, 1999 || Catalina || CSS || ADE || align=right | 7.0 km || 
|-id=647 bgcolor=#E9E9E9
| 66647 ||  || — || September 8, 1999 || Socorro || LINEAR || — || align=right | 2.8 km || 
|-id=648 bgcolor=#d6d6d6
| 66648 ||  || — || September 7, 1999 || Anderson Mesa || LONEOS || — || align=right | 3.6 km || 
|-id=649 bgcolor=#E9E9E9
| 66649 ||  || — || September 7, 1999 || Anderson Mesa || LONEOS || — || align=right | 4.9 km || 
|-id=650 bgcolor=#E9E9E9
| 66650 ||  || — || September 7, 1999 || Anderson Mesa || LONEOS || — || align=right | 1.9 km || 
|-id=651 bgcolor=#E9E9E9
| 66651 ||  || — || September 8, 1999 || Socorro || LINEAR || — || align=right | 8.1 km || 
|-id=652 bgcolor=#C2E0FF
| 66652 Borasisi ||  ||  || September 8, 1999 || Mauna Kea || C. Trujillo, J. X. Luu, D. C. Jewitt || cubewano (cold)moon || align=right | 295 km || 
|-id=653 bgcolor=#d6d6d6
| 66653 ||  || — || September 8, 1999 || Catalina || CSS || EOS || align=right | 4.7 km || 
|-id=654 bgcolor=#E9E9E9
| 66654 ||  || — || September 22, 1999 || Socorro || LINEAR || HNS || align=right | 4.8 km || 
|-id=655 bgcolor=#E9E9E9
| 66655 ||  || — || September 30, 1999 || Kitt Peak || Spacewatch || DOR || align=right | 6.1 km || 
|-id=656 bgcolor=#E9E9E9
| 66656 ||  || — || September 30, 1999 || Socorro || LINEAR || — || align=right | 3.0 km || 
|-id=657 bgcolor=#E9E9E9
| 66657 ||  || — || September 30, 1999 || Socorro || LINEAR || — || align=right | 2.5 km || 
|-id=658 bgcolor=#E9E9E9
| 66658 ||  || — || September 30, 1999 || Socorro || LINEAR || — || align=right | 3.6 km || 
|-id=659 bgcolor=#fefefe
| 66659 ||  || — || October 1, 1999 || Višnjan Observatory || K. Korlević || — || align=right | 3.9 km || 
|-id=660 bgcolor=#E9E9E9
| 66660 ||  || — || October 2, 1999 || Fountain Hills || C. W. Juels || — || align=right | 4.4 km || 
|-id=661 bgcolor=#d6d6d6
| 66661 Wallin ||  ||  || October 2, 1999 || Jornada || D. S. Dixon || — || align=right | 7.9 km || 
|-id=662 bgcolor=#d6d6d6
| 66662 ||  || — || October 3, 1999 || Socorro || LINEAR || — || align=right | 7.1 km || 
|-id=663 bgcolor=#E9E9E9
| 66663 ||  || — || October 6, 1999 || Višnjan Observatory || K. Korlević, M. Jurić || — || align=right | 7.5 km || 
|-id=664 bgcolor=#E9E9E9
| 66664 ||  || — || October 7, 1999 || Višnjan Observatory || K. Korlević, M. Jurić || — || align=right | 3.8 km || 
|-id=665 bgcolor=#E9E9E9
| 66665 ||  || — || October 7, 1999 || Višnjan Observatory || K. Korlević, M. Jurić || — || align=right | 3.0 km || 
|-id=666 bgcolor=#E9E9E9
| 66666 ||  || — || October 7, 1999 || Višnjan Observatory || K. Korlević, M. Jurić || — || align=right | 4.1 km || 
|-id=667 bgcolor=#fefefe
| 66667 Kambič ||  ||  || October 8, 1999 || Črni Vrh || Črni Vrh || FLO || align=right | 1.6 km || 
|-id=668 bgcolor=#d6d6d6
| 66668 ||  || — || October 11, 1999 || Višnjan Observatory || K. Korlević, M. Jurić || — || align=right | 6.3 km || 
|-id=669 bgcolor=#E9E9E9
| 66669 Aradac ||  ||  || October 12, 1999 || Modra || A. Galád, P. Kolény || — || align=right | 4.7 km || 
|-id=670 bgcolor=#E9E9E9
| 66670 ||  || — || October 12, 1999 || Farra d'Isonzo || Farra d'Isonzo || — || align=right | 3.2 km || 
|-id=671 bgcolor=#fefefe
| 66671 Sfasu ||  ||  || October 15, 1999 || Nacogdoches || W. D. Bruton, M. L. Johnson || PHO || align=right | 3.6 km || 
|-id=672 bgcolor=#E9E9E9
| 66672 ||  || — || October 10, 1999 || Xinglong || SCAP || — || align=right | 3.2 km || 
|-id=673 bgcolor=#E9E9E9
| 66673 ||  || — || October 15, 1999 || Višnjan Observatory || K. Korlević || — || align=right | 3.4 km || 
|-id=674 bgcolor=#E9E9E9
| 66674 ||  || — || October 3, 1999 || Socorro || LINEAR || — || align=right | 2.6 km || 
|-id=675 bgcolor=#E9E9E9
| 66675 ||  || — || October 3, 1999 || Socorro || LINEAR || — || align=right | 3.5 km || 
|-id=676 bgcolor=#d6d6d6
| 66676 ||  || — || October 3, 1999 || Socorro || LINEAR || 629 || align=right | 6.6 km || 
|-id=677 bgcolor=#E9E9E9
| 66677 ||  || — || October 4, 1999 || Socorro || LINEAR || — || align=right | 2.2 km || 
|-id=678 bgcolor=#E9E9E9
| 66678 ||  || — || October 4, 1999 || Socorro || LINEAR || — || align=right | 3.7 km || 
|-id=679 bgcolor=#fefefe
| 66679 ||  || — || October 4, 1999 || Socorro || LINEAR || — || align=right | 2.9 km || 
|-id=680 bgcolor=#E9E9E9
| 66680 ||  || — || October 4, 1999 || Socorro || LINEAR || — || align=right | 8.3 km || 
|-id=681 bgcolor=#E9E9E9
| 66681 ||  || — || October 4, 1999 || Socorro || LINEAR || — || align=right | 1.9 km || 
|-id=682 bgcolor=#fefefe
| 66682 ||  || — || October 4, 1999 || Socorro || LINEAR || PHO || align=right | 3.9 km || 
|-id=683 bgcolor=#d6d6d6
| 66683 ||  || — || October 12, 1999 || Anderson Mesa || LONEOS || EOS || align=right | 5.6 km || 
|-id=684 bgcolor=#E9E9E9
| 66684 ||  || — || October 15, 1999 || Anderson Mesa || LONEOS || HNS || align=right | 3.2 km || 
|-id=685 bgcolor=#E9E9E9
| 66685 ||  || — || October 1, 1999 || Catalina || CSS || — || align=right | 3.2 km || 
|-id=686 bgcolor=#E9E9E9
| 66686 ||  || — || October 1, 1999 || Catalina || CSS || — || align=right | 3.8 km || 
|-id=687 bgcolor=#E9E9E9
| 66687 ||  || — || October 3, 1999 || Kitt Peak || Spacewatch || — || align=right | 4.5 km || 
|-id=688 bgcolor=#E9E9E9
| 66688 ||  || — || October 4, 1999 || Kitt Peak || Spacewatch || — || align=right | 5.6 km || 
|-id=689 bgcolor=#fefefe
| 66689 ||  || — || October 6, 1999 || Kitt Peak || Spacewatch || NYS || align=right | 2.0 km || 
|-id=690 bgcolor=#d6d6d6
| 66690 ||  || — || October 7, 1999 || Kitt Peak || Spacewatch || THM || align=right | 7.4 km || 
|-id=691 bgcolor=#fefefe
| 66691 ||  || — || October 8, 1999 || Kitt Peak || Spacewatch || NYS || align=right | 1.1 km || 
|-id=692 bgcolor=#fefefe
| 66692 ||  || — || October 9, 1999 || Kitt Peak || Spacewatch || — || align=right | 1.3 km || 
|-id=693 bgcolor=#E9E9E9
| 66693 ||  || — || October 9, 1999 || Kitt Peak || Spacewatch || — || align=right | 3.7 km || 
|-id=694 bgcolor=#E9E9E9
| 66694 ||  || — || October 9, 1999 || Kitt Peak || Spacewatch || HEN || align=right | 2.1 km || 
|-id=695 bgcolor=#E9E9E9
| 66695 ||  || — || October 10, 1999 || Kitt Peak || Spacewatch || — || align=right | 1.6 km || 
|-id=696 bgcolor=#d6d6d6
| 66696 ||  || — || October 10, 1999 || Kitt Peak || Spacewatch || KOR || align=right | 2.9 km || 
|-id=697 bgcolor=#fefefe
| 66697 ||  || — || October 11, 1999 || Kitt Peak || Spacewatch || FLO || align=right | 1.3 km || 
|-id=698 bgcolor=#E9E9E9
| 66698 ||  || — || October 12, 1999 || Kitt Peak || Spacewatch || AST || align=right | 4.3 km || 
|-id=699 bgcolor=#fefefe
| 66699 ||  || — || October 14, 1999 || Kitt Peak || Spacewatch || MAS || align=right | 1.7 km || 
|-id=700 bgcolor=#fefefe
| 66700 ||  || — || October 14, 1999 || Kitt Peak || Spacewatch || FLO || align=right | 2.2 km || 
|}

66701–66800 

|-bgcolor=#fefefe
| 66701 ||  || — || October 15, 1999 || Kitt Peak || Spacewatch || NYS || align=right | 1.6 km || 
|-id=702 bgcolor=#E9E9E9
| 66702 ||  || — || October 2, 1999 || Socorro || LINEAR || — || align=right | 5.7 km || 
|-id=703 bgcolor=#E9E9E9
| 66703 ||  || — || October 2, 1999 || Socorro || LINEAR || MIS || align=right | 4.1 km || 
|-id=704 bgcolor=#E9E9E9
| 66704 ||  || — || October 2, 1999 || Socorro || LINEAR || — || align=right | 4.5 km || 
|-id=705 bgcolor=#E9E9E9
| 66705 ||  || — || October 2, 1999 || Socorro || LINEAR || — || align=right | 3.7 km || 
|-id=706 bgcolor=#E9E9E9
| 66706 ||  || — || October 2, 1999 || Socorro || LINEAR || — || align=right | 2.4 km || 
|-id=707 bgcolor=#E9E9E9
| 66707 ||  || — || October 2, 1999 || Socorro || LINEAR || — || align=right | 2.4 km || 
|-id=708 bgcolor=#E9E9E9
| 66708 ||  || — || October 2, 1999 || Socorro || LINEAR || — || align=right | 3.6 km || 
|-id=709 bgcolor=#E9E9E9
| 66709 ||  || — || October 2, 1999 || Socorro || LINEAR || — || align=right | 6.1 km || 
|-id=710 bgcolor=#E9E9E9
| 66710 ||  || — || October 2, 1999 || Socorro || LINEAR || — || align=right | 3.8 km || 
|-id=711 bgcolor=#E9E9E9
| 66711 ||  || — || October 2, 1999 || Socorro || LINEAR || MAR || align=right | 3.3 km || 
|-id=712 bgcolor=#E9E9E9
| 66712 ||  || — || October 2, 1999 || Socorro || LINEAR || — || align=right | 3.5 km || 
|-id=713 bgcolor=#E9E9E9
| 66713 ||  || — || October 2, 1999 || Socorro || LINEAR || GEF || align=right | 3.0 km || 
|-id=714 bgcolor=#E9E9E9
| 66714 ||  || — || October 2, 1999 || Socorro || LINEAR || PAL || align=right | 6.1 km || 
|-id=715 bgcolor=#d6d6d6
| 66715 ||  || — || October 2, 1999 || Socorro || LINEAR || EOS || align=right | 6.8 km || 
|-id=716 bgcolor=#E9E9E9
| 66716 ||  || — || October 2, 1999 || Socorro || LINEAR || — || align=right | 3.5 km || 
|-id=717 bgcolor=#E9E9E9
| 66717 ||  || — || October 2, 1999 || Socorro || LINEAR || — || align=right | 5.7 km || 
|-id=718 bgcolor=#E9E9E9
| 66718 ||  || — || October 3, 1999 || Socorro || LINEAR || AGN || align=right | 2.7 km || 
|-id=719 bgcolor=#E9E9E9
| 66719 ||  || — || October 3, 1999 || Socorro || LINEAR || — || align=right | 10 km || 
|-id=720 bgcolor=#fefefe
| 66720 ||  || — || October 3, 1999 || Socorro || LINEAR || — || align=right | 1.6 km || 
|-id=721 bgcolor=#E9E9E9
| 66721 ||  || — || October 4, 1999 || Socorro || LINEAR || — || align=right | 3.1 km || 
|-id=722 bgcolor=#E9E9E9
| 66722 ||  || — || October 4, 1999 || Socorro || LINEAR || — || align=right | 3.5 km || 
|-id=723 bgcolor=#E9E9E9
| 66723 ||  || — || October 4, 1999 || Socorro || LINEAR || — || align=right | 4.1 km || 
|-id=724 bgcolor=#E9E9E9
| 66724 ||  || — || October 4, 1999 || Socorro || LINEAR || — || align=right | 2.6 km || 
|-id=725 bgcolor=#E9E9E9
| 66725 ||  || — || October 4, 1999 || Socorro || LINEAR || — || align=right | 4.5 km || 
|-id=726 bgcolor=#E9E9E9
| 66726 ||  || — || October 4, 1999 || Socorro || LINEAR || — || align=right | 4.1 km || 
|-id=727 bgcolor=#E9E9E9
| 66727 ||  || — || October 4, 1999 || Socorro || LINEAR || PAD || align=right | 6.7 km || 
|-id=728 bgcolor=#E9E9E9
| 66728 ||  || — || October 4, 1999 || Socorro || LINEAR || — || align=right | 3.5 km || 
|-id=729 bgcolor=#E9E9E9
| 66729 ||  || — || October 4, 1999 || Socorro || LINEAR || MAR || align=right | 3.3 km || 
|-id=730 bgcolor=#fefefe
| 66730 ||  || — || October 4, 1999 || Socorro || LINEAR || — || align=right | 3.0 km || 
|-id=731 bgcolor=#d6d6d6
| 66731 ||  || — || October 4, 1999 || Socorro || LINEAR || EOS || align=right | 5.3 km || 
|-id=732 bgcolor=#E9E9E9
| 66732 ||  || — || October 4, 1999 || Socorro || LINEAR || — || align=right | 5.2 km || 
|-id=733 bgcolor=#E9E9E9
| 66733 ||  || — || October 4, 1999 || Socorro || LINEAR || — || align=right | 3.4 km || 
|-id=734 bgcolor=#E9E9E9
| 66734 ||  || — || October 4, 1999 || Socorro || LINEAR || MAR || align=right | 2.9 km || 
|-id=735 bgcolor=#E9E9E9
| 66735 ||  || — || October 4, 1999 || Socorro || LINEAR || — || align=right | 2.0 km || 
|-id=736 bgcolor=#E9E9E9
| 66736 ||  || — || October 4, 1999 || Socorro || LINEAR || HOF || align=right | 7.7 km || 
|-id=737 bgcolor=#E9E9E9
| 66737 ||  || — || October 4, 1999 || Socorro || LINEAR || — || align=right | 3.6 km || 
|-id=738 bgcolor=#E9E9E9
| 66738 ||  || — || October 4, 1999 || Socorro || LINEAR || HOF || align=right | 7.1 km || 
|-id=739 bgcolor=#E9E9E9
| 66739 ||  || — || October 4, 1999 || Socorro || LINEAR || — || align=right | 2.6 km || 
|-id=740 bgcolor=#E9E9E9
| 66740 ||  || — || October 4, 1999 || Socorro || LINEAR || — || align=right | 5.9 km || 
|-id=741 bgcolor=#E9E9E9
| 66741 ||  || — || October 4, 1999 || Socorro || LINEAR || — || align=right | 3.2 km || 
|-id=742 bgcolor=#d6d6d6
| 66742 ||  || — || October 4, 1999 || Socorro || LINEAR || KOR || align=right | 4.4 km || 
|-id=743 bgcolor=#E9E9E9
| 66743 ||  || — || October 4, 1999 || Socorro || LINEAR || — || align=right | 1.9 km || 
|-id=744 bgcolor=#E9E9E9
| 66744 ||  || — || October 5, 1999 || Socorro || LINEAR || EUN || align=right | 3.0 km || 
|-id=745 bgcolor=#E9E9E9
| 66745 ||  || — || October 5, 1999 || Socorro || LINEAR || EUN || align=right | 4.3 km || 
|-id=746 bgcolor=#fefefe
| 66746 ||  || — || October 6, 1999 || Socorro || LINEAR || — || align=right | 2.9 km || 
|-id=747 bgcolor=#E9E9E9
| 66747 ||  || — || October 6, 1999 || Socorro || LINEAR || ADE || align=right | 4.0 km || 
|-id=748 bgcolor=#E9E9E9
| 66748 ||  || — || October 7, 1999 || Socorro || LINEAR || — || align=right | 6.5 km || 
|-id=749 bgcolor=#E9E9E9
| 66749 ||  || — || October 7, 1999 || Socorro || LINEAR || — || align=right | 5.4 km || 
|-id=750 bgcolor=#E9E9E9
| 66750 ||  || — || October 7, 1999 || Socorro || LINEAR || — || align=right | 2.5 km || 
|-id=751 bgcolor=#E9E9E9
| 66751 ||  || — || October 8, 1999 || Socorro || LINEAR || — || align=right | 2.7 km || 
|-id=752 bgcolor=#fefefe
| 66752 ||  || — || October 10, 1999 || Socorro || LINEAR || — || align=right | 1.7 km || 
|-id=753 bgcolor=#d6d6d6
| 66753 ||  || — || October 10, 1999 || Socorro || LINEAR || — || align=right | 3.2 km || 
|-id=754 bgcolor=#E9E9E9
| 66754 ||  || — || October 10, 1999 || Socorro || LINEAR || — || align=right | 4.0 km || 
|-id=755 bgcolor=#E9E9E9
| 66755 ||  || — || October 10, 1999 || Socorro || LINEAR || — || align=right | 3.7 km || 
|-id=756 bgcolor=#E9E9E9
| 66756 ||  || — || October 10, 1999 || Socorro || LINEAR || — || align=right | 2.9 km || 
|-id=757 bgcolor=#E9E9E9
| 66757 ||  || — || October 12, 1999 || Socorro || LINEAR || — || align=right | 5.3 km || 
|-id=758 bgcolor=#E9E9E9
| 66758 ||  || — || October 12, 1999 || Socorro || LINEAR || — || align=right | 3.4 km || 
|-id=759 bgcolor=#E9E9E9
| 66759 ||  || — || October 12, 1999 || Socorro || LINEAR || — || align=right | 7.3 km || 
|-id=760 bgcolor=#E9E9E9
| 66760 ||  || — || October 12, 1999 || Socorro || LINEAR || — || align=right | 6.3 km || 
|-id=761 bgcolor=#E9E9E9
| 66761 ||  || — || October 12, 1999 || Socorro || LINEAR || EUN || align=right | 3.5 km || 
|-id=762 bgcolor=#E9E9E9
| 66762 ||  || — || October 12, 1999 || Socorro || LINEAR || — || align=right | 8.6 km || 
|-id=763 bgcolor=#E9E9E9
| 66763 ||  || — || October 12, 1999 || Socorro || LINEAR || GEF || align=right | 3.5 km || 
|-id=764 bgcolor=#E9E9E9
| 66764 ||  || — || October 12, 1999 || Socorro || LINEAR || — || align=right | 3.9 km || 
|-id=765 bgcolor=#d6d6d6
| 66765 ||  || — || October 12, 1999 || Socorro || LINEAR || — || align=right | 9.2 km || 
|-id=766 bgcolor=#E9E9E9
| 66766 ||  || — || October 12, 1999 || Socorro || LINEAR || — || align=right | 3.2 km || 
|-id=767 bgcolor=#fefefe
| 66767 ||  || — || October 12, 1999 || Socorro || LINEAR || — || align=right | 2.4 km || 
|-id=768 bgcolor=#E9E9E9
| 66768 ||  || — || October 12, 1999 || Socorro || LINEAR || — || align=right | 3.0 km || 
|-id=769 bgcolor=#E9E9E9
| 66769 ||  || — || October 12, 1999 || Socorro || LINEAR || EUN || align=right | 3.2 km || 
|-id=770 bgcolor=#d6d6d6
| 66770 ||  || — || October 14, 1999 || Socorro || LINEAR || ALA || align=right | 14 km || 
|-id=771 bgcolor=#E9E9E9
| 66771 ||  || — || October 14, 1999 || Socorro || LINEAR || — || align=right | 6.3 km || 
|-id=772 bgcolor=#d6d6d6
| 66772 ||  || — || October 15, 1999 || Socorro || LINEAR || — || align=right | 6.2 km || 
|-id=773 bgcolor=#E9E9E9
| 66773 ||  || — || October 1, 1999 || Catalina || CSS || — || align=right | 5.1 km || 
|-id=774 bgcolor=#d6d6d6
| 66774 ||  || — || October 1, 1999 || Catalina || CSS || — || align=right | 9.5 km || 
|-id=775 bgcolor=#E9E9E9
| 66775 ||  || — || October 1, 1999 || Catalina || CSS || MRXslow || align=right | 3.5 km || 
|-id=776 bgcolor=#E9E9E9
| 66776 ||  || — || October 2, 1999 || Catalina || CSS || MAR || align=right | 2.9 km || 
|-id=777 bgcolor=#E9E9E9
| 66777 ||  || — || October 2, 1999 || Catalina || CSS || — || align=right | 4.0 km || 
|-id=778 bgcolor=#E9E9E9
| 66778 ||  || — || October 2, 1999 || Socorro || LINEAR || — || align=right | 3.5 km || 
|-id=779 bgcolor=#E9E9E9
| 66779 ||  || — || October 2, 1999 || Socorro || LINEAR || GEF || align=right | 3.8 km || 
|-id=780 bgcolor=#E9E9E9
| 66780 ||  || — || October 3, 1999 || Catalina || CSS || — || align=right | 3.2 km || 
|-id=781 bgcolor=#E9E9E9
| 66781 ||  || — || October 3, 1999 || Anderson Mesa || LONEOS || EUN || align=right | 2.9 km || 
|-id=782 bgcolor=#d6d6d6
| 66782 ||  || — || October 2, 1999 || Kitt Peak || Spacewatch || EOS || align=right | 4.8 km || 
|-id=783 bgcolor=#E9E9E9
| 66783 ||  || — || October 5, 1999 || Socorro || LINEAR || MAR || align=right | 4.3 km || 
|-id=784 bgcolor=#E9E9E9
| 66784 ||  || — || October 2, 1999 || Socorro || LINEAR || — || align=right | 1.9 km || 
|-id=785 bgcolor=#E9E9E9
| 66785 ||  || — || October 2, 1999 || Socorro || LINEAR || — || align=right | 3.9 km || 
|-id=786 bgcolor=#E9E9E9
| 66786 ||  || — || October 3, 1999 || Kitt Peak || Spacewatch || HEN || align=right | 2.3 km || 
|-id=787 bgcolor=#E9E9E9
| 66787 ||  || — || October 3, 1999 || Kitt Peak || Spacewatch || — || align=right | 5.1 km || 
|-id=788 bgcolor=#E9E9E9
| 66788 ||  || — || October 3, 1999 || Socorro || LINEAR || — || align=right | 5.9 km || 
|-id=789 bgcolor=#E9E9E9
| 66789 ||  || — || October 5, 1999 || Catalina || CSS || MAR || align=right | 2.8 km || 
|-id=790 bgcolor=#E9E9E9
| 66790 ||  || — || October 7, 1999 || Catalina || CSS || — || align=right | 3.8 km || 
|-id=791 bgcolor=#E9E9E9
| 66791 ||  || — || October 3, 1999 || Catalina || CSS || — || align=right | 5.5 km || 
|-id=792 bgcolor=#E9E9E9
| 66792 ||  || — || October 3, 1999 || Socorro || LINEAR || MAR || align=right | 3.9 km || 
|-id=793 bgcolor=#E9E9E9
| 66793 ||  || — || October 3, 1999 || Catalina || CSS || GEF || align=right | 2.6 km || 
|-id=794 bgcolor=#E9E9E9
| 66794 ||  || — || October 4, 1999 || Socorro || LINEAR || — || align=right | 3.2 km || 
|-id=795 bgcolor=#E9E9E9
| 66795 ||  || — || October 8, 1999 || Catalina || CSS || — || align=right | 4.2 km || 
|-id=796 bgcolor=#E9E9E9
| 66796 ||  || — || October 8, 1999 || Socorro || LINEAR || — || align=right | 4.7 km || 
|-id=797 bgcolor=#E9E9E9
| 66797 ||  || — || October 9, 1999 || Socorro || LINEAR || — || align=right | 3.1 km || 
|-id=798 bgcolor=#E9E9E9
| 66798 ||  || — || October 3, 1999 || Socorro || LINEAR || — || align=right | 4.3 km || 
|-id=799 bgcolor=#E9E9E9
| 66799 ||  || — || October 3, 1999 || Socorro || LINEAR || — || align=right | 3.0 km || 
|-id=800 bgcolor=#d6d6d6
| 66800 ||  || — || October 3, 1999 || Socorro || LINEAR || EOS || align=right | 6.1 km || 
|}

66801–66900 

|-bgcolor=#E9E9E9
| 66801 ||  || — || October 3, 1999 || Socorro || LINEAR || GEF || align=right | 3.4 km || 
|-id=802 bgcolor=#E9E9E9
| 66802 ||  || — || October 3, 1999 || Socorro || LINEAR || — || align=right | 4.9 km || 
|-id=803 bgcolor=#E9E9E9
| 66803 ||  || — || October 5, 1999 || Socorro || LINEAR || PAL || align=right | 7.5 km || 
|-id=804 bgcolor=#E9E9E9
| 66804 ||  || — || October 8, 1999 || Socorro || LINEAR || EUN || align=right | 2.4 km || 
|-id=805 bgcolor=#E9E9E9
| 66805 ||  || — || October 9, 1999 || Socorro || LINEAR || — || align=right | 4.4 km || 
|-id=806 bgcolor=#E9E9E9
| 66806 ||  || — || October 10, 1999 || Socorro || LINEAR || MAR || align=right | 3.0 km || 
|-id=807 bgcolor=#E9E9E9
| 66807 ||  || — || October 10, 1999 || Socorro || LINEAR || HEN || align=right | 3.5 km || 
|-id=808 bgcolor=#E9E9E9
| 66808 ||  || — || October 10, 1999 || Socorro || LINEAR || — || align=right | 4.7 km || 
|-id=809 bgcolor=#E9E9E9
| 66809 ||  || — || October 10, 1999 || Socorro || LINEAR || PAD || align=right | 5.5 km || 
|-id=810 bgcolor=#E9E9E9
| 66810 ||  || — || October 29, 1999 || Kitt Peak || Spacewatch || — || align=right | 6.8 km || 
|-id=811 bgcolor=#E9E9E9
| 66811 ||  || — || October 18, 1999 || Xinglong || SCAP || — || align=right | 5.7 km || 
|-id=812 bgcolor=#E9E9E9
| 66812 ||  || — || October 29, 1999 || Catalina || CSS || — || align=right | 2.8 km || 
|-id=813 bgcolor=#E9E9E9
| 66813 ||  || — || October 31, 1999 || Socorro || LINEAR || INO || align=right | 5.4 km || 
|-id=814 bgcolor=#E9E9E9
| 66814 ||  || — || October 29, 1999 || Catalina || CSS || — || align=right | 2.7 km || 
|-id=815 bgcolor=#E9E9E9
| 66815 ||  || — || October 29, 1999 || Catalina || CSS || — || align=right | 3.3 km || 
|-id=816 bgcolor=#E9E9E9
| 66816 ||  || — || October 29, 1999 || Catalina || CSS || GEF || align=right | 2.9 km || 
|-id=817 bgcolor=#E9E9E9
| 66817 ||  || — || October 29, 1999 || Catalina || CSS || — || align=right | 5.4 km || 
|-id=818 bgcolor=#E9E9E9
| 66818 ||  || — || October 29, 1999 || Catalina || CSS || WIT || align=right | 2.6 km || 
|-id=819 bgcolor=#E9E9E9
| 66819 ||  || — || October 30, 1999 || Catalina || CSS || — || align=right | 2.5 km || 
|-id=820 bgcolor=#E9E9E9
| 66820 ||  || — || October 30, 1999 || Kitt Peak || Spacewatch || XIZ || align=right | 2.1 km || 
|-id=821 bgcolor=#E9E9E9
| 66821 ||  || — || October 31, 1999 || Kitt Peak || Spacewatch || — || align=right | 3.4 km || 
|-id=822 bgcolor=#d6d6d6
| 66822 ||  || — || October 31, 1999 || Kitt Peak || Spacewatch || THM || align=right | 4.5 km || 
|-id=823 bgcolor=#E9E9E9
| 66823 ||  || — || October 28, 1999 || Catalina || CSS || — || align=right | 6.1 km || 
|-id=824 bgcolor=#E9E9E9
| 66824 ||  || — || October 30, 1999 || Catalina || CSS || AGN || align=right | 5.1 km || 
|-id=825 bgcolor=#E9E9E9
| 66825 ||  || — || October 30, 1999 || Kitt Peak || Spacewatch || — || align=right | 2.6 km || 
|-id=826 bgcolor=#E9E9E9
| 66826 ||  || — || October 16, 1999 || Kitt Peak || Spacewatch || EUN || align=right | 4.3 km || 
|-id=827 bgcolor=#fefefe
| 66827 ||  || — || October 16, 1999 || Kitt Peak || Spacewatch || NYS || align=right | 1.6 km || 
|-id=828 bgcolor=#E9E9E9
| 66828 ||  || — || October 17, 1999 || Anderson Mesa || LONEOS || ADE || align=right | 4.4 km || 
|-id=829 bgcolor=#E9E9E9
| 66829 ||  || — || October 28, 1999 || Catalina || CSS || — || align=right | 3.6 km || 
|-id=830 bgcolor=#E9E9E9
| 66830 ||  || — || October 28, 1999 || Anderson Mesa || LONEOS || EUN || align=right | 3.6 km || 
|-id=831 bgcolor=#E9E9E9
| 66831 ||  || — || October 29, 1999 || Catalina || CSS || WIT || align=right | 2.4 km || 
|-id=832 bgcolor=#E9E9E9
| 66832 ||  || — || October 31, 1999 || Catalina || CSS || — || align=right | 3.7 km || 
|-id=833 bgcolor=#E9E9E9
| 66833 ||  || — || October 31, 1999 || Catalina || CSS || GEF || align=right | 4.5 km || 
|-id=834 bgcolor=#fefefe
| 66834 ||  || — || October 31, 1999 || Uccle || E. W. Elst || — || align=right | 2.9 km || 
|-id=835 bgcolor=#d6d6d6
| 66835 ||  || — || October 30, 1999 || Catalina || CSS || EOS || align=right | 5.4 km || 
|-id=836 bgcolor=#E9E9E9
| 66836 ||  || — || October 30, 1999 || Catalina || CSS || — || align=right | 5.6 km || 
|-id=837 bgcolor=#E9E9E9
| 66837 ||  || — || October 31, 1999 || Catalina || CSS || — || align=right | 2.9 km || 
|-id=838 bgcolor=#E9E9E9
| 66838 ||  || — || October 31, 1999 || Catalina || CSS || — || align=right | 4.1 km || 
|-id=839 bgcolor=#E9E9E9
| 66839 ||  || — || October 31, 1999 || Catalina || CSS || — || align=right | 3.5 km || 
|-id=840 bgcolor=#E9E9E9
| 66840 ||  || — || October 31, 1999 || Catalina || CSS || DOR || align=right | 5.6 km || 
|-id=841 bgcolor=#E9E9E9
| 66841 ||  || — || October 31, 1999 || Catalina || CSS || — || align=right | 4.8 km || 
|-id=842 bgcolor=#E9E9E9
| 66842 ||  || — || October 20, 1999 || Anderson Mesa || LONEOS || — || align=right | 4.0 km || 
|-id=843 bgcolor=#E9E9E9
| 66843 Pulido || 1999 VG ||  || November 1, 1999 || Oaxaca || J. M. Roe || VIB || align=right | 5.4 km || 
|-id=844 bgcolor=#E9E9E9
| 66844 || 1999 VP || — || November 1, 1999 || Fountain Hills || C. W. Juels || — || align=right | 4.1 km || 
|-id=845 bgcolor=#E9E9E9
| 66845 ||  || — || November 5, 1999 || High Point || D. K. Chesney || — || align=right | 2.4 km || 
|-id=846 bgcolor=#E9E9E9
| 66846 Franklederer ||  ||  || November 6, 1999 || Lime Creek || R. Linderholm || PAL || align=right | 5.1 km || 
|-id=847 bgcolor=#fefefe
| 66847 ||  || — || November 5, 1999 || Višnjan Observatory || K. Korlević || — || align=right | 1.9 km || 
|-id=848 bgcolor=#d6d6d6
| 66848 ||  || — || November 5, 1999 || Oizumi || T. Kobayashi || — || align=right | 11 km || 
|-id=849 bgcolor=#E9E9E9
| 66849 ||  || — || November 4, 1999 || Bédoin || P. Antonini || — || align=right | 6.1 km || 
|-id=850 bgcolor=#E9E9E9
| 66850 ||  || — || November 9, 1999 || Fountain Hills || C. W. Juels || MIT || align=right | 6.5 km || 
|-id=851 bgcolor=#E9E9E9
| 66851 ||  || — || November 9, 1999 || Fountain Hills || C. W. Juels || EUN || align=right | 4.8 km || 
|-id=852 bgcolor=#E9E9E9
| 66852 ||  || — || November 9, 1999 || Višnjan Observatory || K. Korlević || NEM || align=right | 3.7 km || 
|-id=853 bgcolor=#E9E9E9
| 66853 ||  || — || November 10, 1999 || High Point || D. K. Chesney || IAN || align=right | 2.7 km || 
|-id=854 bgcolor=#E9E9E9
| 66854 ||  || — || November 10, 1999 || Višnjan Observatory || K. Korlević || — || align=right | 2.2 km || 
|-id=855 bgcolor=#E9E9E9
| 66855 ||  || — || November 13, 1999 || Fountain Hills || C. W. Juels || — || align=right | 4.7 km || 
|-id=856 bgcolor=#E9E9E9
| 66856 Stephenvoss ||  ||  || November 13, 1999 || Lake Tekapo || I. P. Griffin, N. Brady || — || align=right | 3.6 km || 
|-id=857 bgcolor=#E9E9E9
| 66857 ||  || — || November 15, 1999 || Kleť || Kleť Obs. || — || align=right | 6.6 km || 
|-id=858 bgcolor=#E9E9E9
| 66858 ||  || — || November 3, 1999 || Catalina || CSS || — || align=right | 2.6 km || 
|-id=859 bgcolor=#d6d6d6
| 66859 ||  || — || November 3, 1999 || Socorro || LINEAR || BRA || align=right | 3.6 km || 
|-id=860 bgcolor=#E9E9E9
| 66860 ||  || — || November 3, 1999 || Socorro || LINEAR || GEF || align=right | 2.9 km || 
|-id=861 bgcolor=#E9E9E9
| 66861 ||  || — || November 3, 1999 || Socorro || LINEAR || — || align=right | 4.7 km || 
|-id=862 bgcolor=#E9E9E9
| 66862 ||  || — || November 3, 1999 || Socorro || LINEAR || — || align=right | 4.6 km || 
|-id=863 bgcolor=#E9E9E9
| 66863 ||  || — || November 1, 1999 || Catalina || CSS || WIT || align=right | 2.6 km || 
|-id=864 bgcolor=#E9E9E9
| 66864 ||  || — || November 3, 1999 || Catalina || CSS || — || align=right | 5.1 km || 
|-id=865 bgcolor=#E9E9E9
| 66865 ||  || — || November 3, 1999 || Catalina || CSS || — || align=right | 4.0 km || 
|-id=866 bgcolor=#E9E9E9
| 66866 ||  || — || November 4, 1999 || Catalina || CSS || — || align=right | 11 km || 
|-id=867 bgcolor=#E9E9E9
| 66867 ||  || — || November 3, 1999 || Socorro || LINEAR || EUN || align=right | 5.0 km || 
|-id=868 bgcolor=#E9E9E9
| 66868 ||  || — || November 3, 1999 || Socorro || LINEAR || KON || align=right | 6.0 km || 
|-id=869 bgcolor=#E9E9E9
| 66869 ||  || — || November 3, 1999 || Socorro || LINEAR || — || align=right | 4.3 km || 
|-id=870 bgcolor=#E9E9E9
| 66870 ||  || — || November 3, 1999 || Socorro || LINEAR || GEF || align=right | 4.3 km || 
|-id=871 bgcolor=#E9E9E9
| 66871 ||  || — || November 3, 1999 || Socorro || LINEAR || — || align=right | 4.4 km || 
|-id=872 bgcolor=#E9E9E9
| 66872 ||  || — || November 3, 1999 || Socorro || LINEAR || — || align=right | 5.6 km || 
|-id=873 bgcolor=#E9E9E9
| 66873 ||  || — || November 3, 1999 || Socorro || LINEAR || — || align=right | 3.3 km || 
|-id=874 bgcolor=#d6d6d6
| 66874 ||  || — || November 3, 1999 || Socorro || LINEAR || — || align=right | 2.8 km || 
|-id=875 bgcolor=#E9E9E9
| 66875 ||  || — || November 3, 1999 || Socorro || LINEAR || — || align=right | 4.6 km || 
|-id=876 bgcolor=#E9E9E9
| 66876 ||  || — || November 4, 1999 || Socorro || LINEAR || — || align=right | 3.3 km || 
|-id=877 bgcolor=#E9E9E9
| 66877 ||  || — || November 4, 1999 || Socorro || LINEAR || — || align=right | 6.1 km || 
|-id=878 bgcolor=#E9E9E9
| 66878 ||  || — || November 4, 1999 || Socorro || LINEAR || — || align=right | 4.6 km || 
|-id=879 bgcolor=#d6d6d6
| 66879 ||  || — || November 4, 1999 || Socorro || LINEAR || — || align=right | 7.4 km || 
|-id=880 bgcolor=#E9E9E9
| 66880 ||  || — || November 4, 1999 || Socorro || LINEAR || — || align=right | 6.3 km || 
|-id=881 bgcolor=#d6d6d6
| 66881 ||  || — || November 4, 1999 || Socorro || LINEAR || KOR || align=right | 3.2 km || 
|-id=882 bgcolor=#E9E9E9
| 66882 ||  || — || November 4, 1999 || Socorro || LINEAR || — || align=right | 4.9 km || 
|-id=883 bgcolor=#d6d6d6
| 66883 ||  || — || November 4, 1999 || Socorro || LINEAR || KOR || align=right | 2.5 km || 
|-id=884 bgcolor=#E9E9E9
| 66884 ||  || — || November 4, 1999 || Socorro || LINEAR || AST || align=right | 5.0 km || 
|-id=885 bgcolor=#d6d6d6
| 66885 Wangxiaomo ||  ||  || November 12, 1999 || Xinglong || SCAP || EOS || align=right | 5.1 km || 
|-id=886 bgcolor=#E9E9E9
| 66886 ||  || — || November 12, 1999 || Xinglong || SCAP || CLO || align=right | 7.2 km || 
|-id=887 bgcolor=#E9E9E9
| 66887 ||  || — || November 5, 1999 || Kitt Peak || Spacewatch || — || align=right | 5.8 km || 
|-id=888 bgcolor=#E9E9E9
| 66888 ||  || — || November 4, 1999 || Socorro || LINEAR || — || align=right | 3.7 km || 
|-id=889 bgcolor=#E9E9E9
| 66889 ||  || — || November 4, 1999 || Socorro || LINEAR || — || align=right | 4.4 km || 
|-id=890 bgcolor=#d6d6d6
| 66890 ||  || — || November 4, 1999 || Socorro || LINEAR || — || align=right | 3.9 km || 
|-id=891 bgcolor=#E9E9E9
| 66891 ||  || — || November 5, 1999 || Catalina || CSS || — || align=right | 3.6 km || 
|-id=892 bgcolor=#E9E9E9
| 66892 ||  || — || November 5, 1999 || Socorro || LINEAR || — || align=right | 4.2 km || 
|-id=893 bgcolor=#E9E9E9
| 66893 ||  || — || November 5, 1999 || Socorro || LINEAR || — || align=right | 5.9 km || 
|-id=894 bgcolor=#d6d6d6
| 66894 ||  || — || November 9, 1999 || Socorro || LINEAR || KOR || align=right | 2.8 km || 
|-id=895 bgcolor=#d6d6d6
| 66895 ||  || — || November 9, 1999 || Socorro || LINEAR || — || align=right | 8.5 km || 
|-id=896 bgcolor=#d6d6d6
| 66896 ||  || — || November 9, 1999 || Socorro || LINEAR || — || align=right | 4.6 km || 
|-id=897 bgcolor=#E9E9E9
| 66897 ||  || — || November 9, 1999 || Catalina || CSS || — || align=right | 5.9 km || 
|-id=898 bgcolor=#E9E9E9
| 66898 ||  || — || November 9, 1999 || Catalina || CSS || ADE || align=right | 7.9 km || 
|-id=899 bgcolor=#E9E9E9
| 66899 ||  || — || November 9, 1999 || Catalina || CSS || EUN || align=right | 4.1 km || 
|-id=900 bgcolor=#E9E9E9
| 66900 ||  || — || November 9, 1999 || Kitt Peak || Spacewatch || — || align=right | 2.8 km || 
|}

66901–67000 

|-bgcolor=#E9E9E9
| 66901 ||  || — || November 13, 1999 || Anderson Mesa || LONEOS || — || align=right | 5.6 km || 
|-id=902 bgcolor=#E9E9E9
| 66902 ||  || — || November 11, 1999 || Catalina || CSS || AGN || align=right | 3.3 km || 
|-id=903 bgcolor=#d6d6d6
| 66903 ||  || — || November 12, 1999 || Socorro || LINEAR || — || align=right | 6.4 km || 
|-id=904 bgcolor=#d6d6d6
| 66904 ||  || — || November 14, 1999 || Socorro || LINEAR || — || align=right | 6.6 km || 
|-id=905 bgcolor=#E9E9E9
| 66905 ||  || — || November 14, 1999 || Socorro || LINEAR || — || align=right | 5.9 km || 
|-id=906 bgcolor=#E9E9E9
| 66906 ||  || — || November 14, 1999 || Socorro || LINEAR || AGN || align=right | 2.6 km || 
|-id=907 bgcolor=#d6d6d6
| 66907 ||  || — || November 14, 1999 || Socorro || LINEAR || — || align=right | 5.2 km || 
|-id=908 bgcolor=#d6d6d6
| 66908 ||  || — || November 14, 1999 || Socorro || LINEAR || — || align=right | 3.4 km || 
|-id=909 bgcolor=#d6d6d6
| 66909 ||  || — || November 14, 1999 || Socorro || LINEAR || — || align=right | 5.0 km || 
|-id=910 bgcolor=#fefefe
| 66910 ||  || — || November 14, 1999 || Socorro || LINEAR || V || align=right | 1.6 km || 
|-id=911 bgcolor=#E9E9E9
| 66911 ||  || — || November 14, 1999 || Socorro || LINEAR || — || align=right | 2.8 km || 
|-id=912 bgcolor=#d6d6d6
| 66912 ||  || — || November 14, 1999 || Socorro || LINEAR || KOR || align=right | 3.6 km || 
|-id=913 bgcolor=#d6d6d6
| 66913 ||  || — || November 14, 1999 || Socorro || LINEAR || KOR || align=right | 3.1 km || 
|-id=914 bgcolor=#fefefe
| 66914 ||  || — || November 14, 1999 || Socorro || LINEAR || MAS || align=right | 1.5 km || 
|-id=915 bgcolor=#E9E9E9
| 66915 ||  || — || November 14, 1999 || Socorro || LINEAR || RAF || align=right | 4.5 km || 
|-id=916 bgcolor=#E9E9E9
| 66916 ||  || — || November 3, 1999 || Socorro || LINEAR || — || align=right | 3.0 km || 
|-id=917 bgcolor=#E9E9E9
| 66917 ||  || — || November 5, 1999 || Socorro || LINEAR || MAR || align=right | 4.2 km || 
|-id=918 bgcolor=#E9E9E9
| 66918 ||  || — || November 5, 1999 || Socorro || LINEAR || — || align=right | 4.0 km || 
|-id=919 bgcolor=#E9E9E9
| 66919 ||  || — || November 5, 1999 || Socorro || LINEAR || — || align=right | 3.3 km || 
|-id=920 bgcolor=#E9E9E9
| 66920 ||  || — || November 6, 1999 || Socorro || LINEAR || — || align=right | 4.8 km || 
|-id=921 bgcolor=#d6d6d6
| 66921 ||  || — || November 6, 1999 || Socorro || LINEAR || — || align=right | 5.8 km || 
|-id=922 bgcolor=#E9E9E9
| 66922 ||  || — || November 15, 1999 || Socorro || LINEAR || — || align=right | 2.6 km || 
|-id=923 bgcolor=#E9E9E9
| 66923 ||  || — || November 15, 1999 || Socorro || LINEAR || — || align=right | 4.4 km || 
|-id=924 bgcolor=#d6d6d6
| 66924 ||  || — || November 15, 1999 || Socorro || LINEAR || HYG || align=right | 7.1 km || 
|-id=925 bgcolor=#fefefe
| 66925 ||  || — || November 10, 1999 || Socorro || LINEAR || — || align=right | 5.0 km || 
|-id=926 bgcolor=#d6d6d6
| 66926 ||  || — || November 1, 1999 || Anderson Mesa || LONEOS || 628 || align=right | 6.9 km || 
|-id=927 bgcolor=#d6d6d6
| 66927 ||  || — || November 2, 1999 || Catalina || CSS || AEG || align=right | 7.4 km || 
|-id=928 bgcolor=#E9E9E9
| 66928 ||  || — || November 2, 1999 || Catalina || CSS || — || align=right | 4.7 km || 
|-id=929 bgcolor=#E9E9E9
| 66929 ||  || — || November 4, 1999 || Anderson Mesa || LONEOS || — || align=right | 3.3 km || 
|-id=930 bgcolor=#E9E9E9
| 66930 ||  || — || November 3, 1999 || Socorro || LINEAR || — || align=right | 6.1 km || 
|-id=931 bgcolor=#d6d6d6
| 66931 ||  || — || November 10, 1999 || Socorro || LINEAR || — || align=right | 12 km || 
|-id=932 bgcolor=#E9E9E9
| 66932 ||  || — || November 13, 1999 || Anderson Mesa || LONEOS || — || align=right | 3.5 km || 
|-id=933 bgcolor=#E9E9E9
| 66933 ||  || — || November 5, 1999 || Socorro || LINEAR || CLO || align=right | 4.2 km || 
|-id=934 bgcolor=#fefefe
| 66934 Kálalová ||  ||  || November 26, 1999 || Kleť || J. Tichá, M. Tichý || — || align=right | 4.5 km || 
|-id=935 bgcolor=#E9E9E9
| 66935 ||  || — || November 26, 1999 || Višnjan Observatory || K. Korlević || CLO || align=right | 5.9 km || 
|-id=936 bgcolor=#E9E9E9
| 66936 ||  || — || November 28, 1999 || Oizumi || T. Kobayashi || EUN || align=right | 4.7 km || 
|-id=937 bgcolor=#E9E9E9
| 66937 ||  || — || November 28, 1999 || Višnjan Observatory || K. Korlević || — || align=right | 3.8 km || 
|-id=938 bgcolor=#E9E9E9
| 66938 ||  || — || November 29, 1999 || Monte Agliale || S. Donati || — || align=right | 2.9 km || 
|-id=939 bgcolor=#d6d6d6
| 66939 Franscini ||  ||  || November 28, 1999 || Gnosca || S. Sposetti || EOS || align=right | 5.1 km || 
|-id=940 bgcolor=#E9E9E9
| 66940 ||  || — || November 29, 1999 || Nachi-Katsuura || H. Shiozawa, T. Urata || DOR || align=right | 7.4 km || 
|-id=941 bgcolor=#d6d6d6
| 66941 ||  || — || November 29, 1999 || Nachi-Katsuura || H. Shiozawa, T. Urata || — || align=right | 6.7 km || 
|-id=942 bgcolor=#E9E9E9
| 66942 ||  || — || November 29, 1999 || Kitt Peak || Spacewatch || — || align=right | 3.6 km || 
|-id=943 bgcolor=#E9E9E9
| 66943 ||  || — || November 30, 1999 || Kitt Peak || Spacewatch || — || align=right | 3.9 km || 
|-id=944 bgcolor=#E9E9E9
| 66944 ||  || — || November 16, 1999 || Catalina || CSS || — || align=right | 4.3 km || 
|-id=945 bgcolor=#d6d6d6
| 66945 ||  || — || December 2, 1999 || Oizumi || T. Kobayashi || EOS || align=right | 6.3 km || 
|-id=946 bgcolor=#d6d6d6
| 66946 ||  || — || December 3, 1999 || Baton Rouge || W. R. Cooney Jr. || — || align=right | 8.9 km || 
|-id=947 bgcolor=#E9E9E9
| 66947 ||  || — || December 3, 1999 || Fountain Hills || C. W. Juels || GEF || align=right | 4.6 km || 
|-id=948 bgcolor=#d6d6d6
| 66948 ||  || — || December 4, 1999 || Catalina || CSS || — || align=right | 2.9 km || 
|-id=949 bgcolor=#E9E9E9
| 66949 ||  || — || December 4, 1999 || Fountain Hills || C. W. Juels || EUN || align=right | 6.5 km || 
|-id=950 bgcolor=#d6d6d6
| 66950 ||  || — || December 6, 1999 || Catalina || CSS || — || align=right | 4.8 km || 
|-id=951 bgcolor=#E9E9E9
| 66951 ||  || — || December 5, 1999 || Socorro || LINEAR || GEF || align=right | 3.8 km || 
|-id=952 bgcolor=#E9E9E9
| 66952 ||  || — || December 3, 1999 || Socorro || LINEAR || — || align=right | 4.7 km || 
|-id=953 bgcolor=#E9E9E9
| 66953 ||  || — || December 3, 1999 || Socorro || LINEAR || ADE || align=right | 5.0 km || 
|-id=954 bgcolor=#E9E9E9
| 66954 ||  || — || December 5, 1999 || Socorro || LINEAR || ADE || align=right | 6.1 km || 
|-id=955 bgcolor=#E9E9E9
| 66955 ||  || — || December 5, 1999 || Socorro || LINEAR || — || align=right | 2.6 km || 
|-id=956 bgcolor=#fefefe
| 66956 ||  || — || December 5, 1999 || Socorro || LINEAR || — || align=right | 1.5 km || 
|-id=957 bgcolor=#E9E9E9
| 66957 ||  || — || December 5, 1999 || Socorro || LINEAR || — || align=right | 5.1 km || 
|-id=958 bgcolor=#E9E9E9
| 66958 ||  || — || December 6, 1999 || Socorro || LINEAR || — || align=right | 6.3 km || 
|-id=959 bgcolor=#FFC2E0
| 66959 ||  || — || December 6, 1999 || Socorro || LINEAR || AMO +1km || align=right | 1.7 km || 
|-id=960 bgcolor=#E9E9E9
| 66960 ||  || — || December 7, 1999 || Fountain Hills || C. W. Juels || — || align=right | 4.8 km || 
|-id=961 bgcolor=#E9E9E9
| 66961 ||  || — || December 7, 1999 || Socorro || LINEAR || — || align=right | 2.8 km || 
|-id=962 bgcolor=#fefefe
| 66962 ||  || — || December 7, 1999 || Socorro || LINEAR || NYS || align=right | 1.6 km || 
|-id=963 bgcolor=#E9E9E9
| 66963 ||  || — || December 7, 1999 || Socorro || LINEAR || — || align=right | 3.2 km || 
|-id=964 bgcolor=#d6d6d6
| 66964 ||  || — || December 7, 1999 || Socorro || LINEAR || EOS || align=right | 4.1 km || 
|-id=965 bgcolor=#d6d6d6
| 66965 ||  || — || December 7, 1999 || Socorro || LINEAR || — || align=right | 6.2 km || 
|-id=966 bgcolor=#d6d6d6
| 66966 ||  || — || December 7, 1999 || Socorro || LINEAR || — || align=right | 8.8 km || 
|-id=967 bgcolor=#d6d6d6
| 66967 ||  || — || December 7, 1999 || Socorro || LINEAR || — || align=right | 6.0 km || 
|-id=968 bgcolor=#fefefe
| 66968 ||  || — || December 7, 1999 || Socorro || LINEAR || — || align=right | 1.6 km || 
|-id=969 bgcolor=#d6d6d6
| 66969 ||  || — || December 7, 1999 || Socorro || LINEAR || — || align=right | 3.3 km || 
|-id=970 bgcolor=#E9E9E9
| 66970 ||  || — || December 7, 1999 || Socorro || LINEAR || — || align=right | 3.6 km || 
|-id=971 bgcolor=#E9E9E9
| 66971 ||  || — || December 7, 1999 || Socorro || LINEAR || — || align=right | 4.9 km || 
|-id=972 bgcolor=#fefefe
| 66972 ||  || — || December 7, 1999 || Socorro || LINEAR || V || align=right | 1.6 km || 
|-id=973 bgcolor=#fefefe
| 66973 ||  || — || December 7, 1999 || Socorro || LINEAR || — || align=right | 1.7 km || 
|-id=974 bgcolor=#E9E9E9
| 66974 ||  || — || December 7, 1999 || Socorro || LINEAR || CLO || align=right | 4.9 km || 
|-id=975 bgcolor=#d6d6d6
| 66975 ||  || — || December 7, 1999 || Socorro || LINEAR || — || align=right | 3.0 km || 
|-id=976 bgcolor=#d6d6d6
| 66976 ||  || — || December 7, 1999 || Socorro || LINEAR || — || align=right | 4.7 km || 
|-id=977 bgcolor=#d6d6d6
| 66977 ||  || — || December 7, 1999 || Socorro || LINEAR || — || align=right | 9.2 km || 
|-id=978 bgcolor=#E9E9E9
| 66978 ||  || — || December 7, 1999 || Socorro || LINEAR || — || align=right | 3.4 km || 
|-id=979 bgcolor=#d6d6d6
| 66979 ||  || — || December 7, 1999 || Socorro || LINEAR || — || align=right | 9.5 km || 
|-id=980 bgcolor=#d6d6d6
| 66980 ||  || — || December 7, 1999 || Socorro || LINEAR || — || align=right | 7.0 km || 
|-id=981 bgcolor=#d6d6d6
| 66981 ||  || — || December 7, 1999 || Socorro || LINEAR || EOS || align=right | 6.3 km || 
|-id=982 bgcolor=#d6d6d6
| 66982 ||  || — || December 7, 1999 || Socorro || LINEAR || — || align=right | 8.0 km || 
|-id=983 bgcolor=#d6d6d6
| 66983 ||  || — || December 7, 1999 || Socorro || LINEAR || — || align=right | 8.9 km || 
|-id=984 bgcolor=#d6d6d6
| 66984 ||  || — || December 7, 1999 || Socorro || LINEAR || EOS || align=right | 4.4 km || 
|-id=985 bgcolor=#d6d6d6
| 66985 ||  || — || December 7, 1999 || Socorro || LINEAR || — || align=right | 13 km || 
|-id=986 bgcolor=#d6d6d6
| 66986 ||  || — || December 7, 1999 || Oizumi || T. Kobayashi || EOS || align=right | 4.5 km || 
|-id=987 bgcolor=#d6d6d6
| 66987 ||  || — || December 9, 1999 || Oizumi || T. Kobayashi || EOS || align=right | 5.0 km || 
|-id=988 bgcolor=#E9E9E9
| 66988 ||  || — || December 7, 1999 || Socorro || LINEAR || — || align=right | 3.2 km || 
|-id=989 bgcolor=#d6d6d6
| 66989 ||  || — || December 7, 1999 || Socorro || LINEAR || — || align=right | 7.6 km || 
|-id=990 bgcolor=#d6d6d6
| 66990 ||  || — || December 7, 1999 || Socorro || LINEAR || THM || align=right | 7.7 km || 
|-id=991 bgcolor=#E9E9E9
| 66991 ||  || — || December 9, 1999 || Fountain Hills || C. W. Juels || — || align=right | 6.6 km || 
|-id=992 bgcolor=#d6d6d6
| 66992 ||  || — || December 4, 1999 || Catalina || CSS || EOS || align=right | 5.2 km || 
|-id=993 bgcolor=#E9E9E9
| 66993 ||  || — || December 4, 1999 || Catalina || CSS || — || align=right | 3.1 km || 
|-id=994 bgcolor=#E9E9E9
| 66994 ||  || — || December 4, 1999 || Catalina || CSS || — || align=right | 4.5 km || 
|-id=995 bgcolor=#d6d6d6
| 66995 ||  || — || December 4, 1999 || Catalina || CSS || — || align=right | 2.9 km || 
|-id=996 bgcolor=#E9E9E9
| 66996 ||  || — || December 11, 1999 || Socorro || LINEAR || — || align=right | 6.4 km || 
|-id=997 bgcolor=#E9E9E9
| 66997 ||  || — || December 11, 1999 || Socorro || LINEAR || EUN || align=right | 4.8 km || 
|-id=998 bgcolor=#E9E9E9
| 66998 ||  || — || December 11, 1999 || Socorro || LINEAR || — || align=right | 4.1 km || 
|-id=999 bgcolor=#d6d6d6
| 66999 Cudnik ||  ||  || December 5, 1999 || Catalina || CSS || EOS || align=right | 5.4 km || 
|-id=000 bgcolor=#fefefe
| 67000 ||  || — || December 5, 1999 || Catalina || CSS || V || align=right | 1.4 km || 
|}

References

External links 
 Discovery Circumstances: Numbered Minor Planets (65001)–(70000) (IAU Minor Planet Center)

0066